= List of Swiss painters =

A list of notable Swiss painters:

== A ==
- Johann Ludwig Aberli
- Otto Abt
- René Acht
- Hans Aeschbacher
- Jacques-Laurent Agasse
- Heinrich Altherr
- Urs Amann
- Cuno Amiet
- Jost Amman
- Werner Andermatt
- Albert Anker
- Dominique Appia
- Dennis Armitage
- Hans Asper
- René Auberjonois

== B ==
- Claudio Baccalà
- Silvia Bächli
- Augustin Meinrad Bächtiger
- Karl Ballmer
- Aimé Barraud
- François Barraud
- Franz Karl Basler-Kopp
- Auguste Baud-Bovy
- Ernst Baumann
- Fritz Baumann
- Ida Baumann
- Otto Baumberger
- Hans Bendel
- Emilio Maria Beretta
- Hans Eduard von Berlepsch-Valendas
- Giuseppe Bernardazzi
- Emil Beurmann
- Diego Bianconi
- Heinrich Bichler
- Johann Jakob Biedermann
- Klaus Bietenholz
- Max Bill
- Edmond Bille
- Peter Birkhäuser
- Peter Birmann
- Samuel Birmann
- Johann Heinrich Bleuler
- Johann Ludwig Bleuler
- François Bocion
- Arnold Böcklin
- Karl Bodmer
- Paul Bodmer
- Walter Bodmer
- Max Böhlen
- Carlo Borer
- Marius Borgeaud
- Louise-Cathérine Breslau
- Serge Brignoni
- Arnold Brügger
- Hans-Ulrich Brunner
- Emanuel Büchel
- Franz Bucher
- Frank Buchser
- Johann Balthasar Bullinger
- Jenny Burckhardt
- Johann Burger
- Max Buri
- Joseph Burkhardt-Born
- Eugène Burnand
- Carlo Antonio Bussi
- Anton Bütler
- Joseph Niklaus Bütler
- Niklaus Bütler
- Johann Rudolf Byss

== C ==
- Alexandre Calame
- Paul Camenisch
- Gianfredo Camesi
- Joseph Caspar
- Luciano Castelli
- Edouard Castres
- Coghuf
- Luca Antonio Colomba
- Giovanni Battista Innocenzo Colombo
- Mario Comensoli
- Hans Coray
- Aloïse Corbaz
- Corinne Cuéllar-Nathan

== D ==
- Helen Dahm
- Heinrich Danioth
- Paul Degen
- Sandro del Prete
- François Diday
- Adolf Dietrich
- Martin Disler
- Martin Disteli
- Willi Dreesen
- Stéphane Ducret
- Henri Dufaux

== E ==
- Theo Eble
- Ulla Engeberg Killias
- Walter Enholtz
- Charles l’Eplattenier
- Ruth Erat
- Hans Erni
- André Evard

== F ==
- Janika Fabrikant
- Hans Falk
- Helmut Federle
- Franz Fedier
- Hans Ulrich Fisch
- Hans Fischer
- Jakob Flach
- Annemie Fontana
- Sigmund Freudenberger
- Ernst Frick
- Hans Fries
- Pia Fries
- Otto Frölicher
- Johann Heinrich Füssli

== G ==
- Léon Gaud
- Ferdinand Gehr
- Franz Gertsch
- Salomon Gessner
- Alberto Giacometti
- Augusto Giacometti
- Giovanni Giacometti
- Babeli Giezendanner
- H. R. Giger
- René Gilsi
- Francesco Antonio Giorgioli
- Charles Girardet
- Fritz Glarner
- Charles Gleyre
- Theo Glinz
- Carl Arnold Gonzenbach
- Camille Graeser
- Urs Graf der Ältere
- Anton Graff
- Eugène Grasset
- Konrad Grob
- Eduard Gubler
- Max Gubler
- Alis Guggenheim

== H ==
- Stefan Haenni
- Hedy Hahnloser-Bühler
- Jakob Emanuel Handmann
- Johannes Handschin
- Jakob Häne
- Eugen Hartung
- Willi Hartung
- Pierre Haubensak
- Max Haufler
- Franz Hegi
- Georg Friedrich Heilmann
- Joseph Heintz der Ältere
- Andreas Henzen
- Maria Herrmann-Kaufmann
- Heinrich Herzig
- David Hess
- Ludwig Hess
- Hermann Hesse
- Charles Hindenlang
- Hermann Hirzel
- Ferdinand Hodler
- Gottfried Honegger
- Jean Huber Voltaire
- Ernest Hubert
- Alain Huck
- Daniel Humair
- Wilhelm Hummel
- Alfonso Hüppi
- Johannes Hüppi
- Manfred Hürlimann
- Britta Huttenlocher

== I ==
- Leiko Ikemura
- Anna Indermaur
- Robert Indermaur
- Rolf Iseli

== J ==
- Urs Jaeggi
- Karl Jauslin

== K ==
- Max Kämpf
- Adam Dario Keel
- Carl Eugen Keel
- Albert von Keller
- Paul Klee
- Rolf Knie
- Max Kohler
- Rudolf Koller
- Franz Niklaus König
- Ernst Kreidolf
- Christina Krusi
- Hans Krüsi

== L ==
- Salomon Landolt
- Pierre-Louis de La Rive
- Le Corbusier
- Hans Leu the Elder
- Leo Leuppi
- Alois Lichtsteiner
- Ernst Linck
- Carl August Liner
- Carl Walter Liner
- Walter Linsenmaier
- Jean-Étienne Liotard
- Carlo E. Lischetti
- Verena Loewensberg
- Paul Lohse
- Urs Lüthi

== M ==
- Niklaus Manuel
- Barthélemy Menn
- Youri Messen-Jaschin
- Dölf Mettler
- Johann Heinrich Meyer
- Otto Meyer-Amden
- Caroline Mezger
- Elvezia Michel-Baldini
- Werner Miller
- Gottfried Mind
- Louis Moilliet
- Paul Monnier
- Max von Moos
- Otto Morach
- Ernst Morgenthaler
- Fritz Morgenthaler
- Didier Mouron
- Max von Mühlenen
- Heinrich Anton Müller
- Josef Felix Müller
- Rudolf Münger

== O ==
- Max Oertli
- Franz K. Opitz
- Meret Oppenheim

== P ==
- Edmond de Palézieux
- Leta Peer
- Alfred Heinrich Pellegrini
- Alexandre Perrier
- Jean Petitot
- Niki de Saint Phalle
- Celestino Piatti
- Otto Pilny
- Marcel Poncet
- Fritz Pümpin
- Karl Pümpin

== R ==
- Richard Ranft
- Clara von Rappard
- Karl Rauber
- Joseph Reinhart
- Maurice Reymond de Broutelles
- Sigismund Righini
- Louis Léopold Robert
- Théophile Robert
- Charles Rollier
- Rüdisühli
- Hermann Rüdisühli
- Christoph Rütimann

== S ==
- Claude Sandoz
- Edouard-Marcel Sandoz
- Hans Sandreuter
- Johann Rudolph Schellenberg
- Hermann Scherer
- Hedwig Scherrer
- Wilhelm Scheuchzer
- Robert Schiess
- Klaudia Schifferle
- Erna Schillig
- Alfons Schilling
- Wilhelm Schmid
- Gérard Ernest Schneider
- Johann Robert Schürch
- Carlos Schwabe
- Albert Schweizer
- Peter Schweri
- Giovanni Segantini
- Gregorius Sickinger
- Guido Sigriste
- Ota Šik
- Caroline Sophie Sordet-Boissonnas
- Louis Soutter
- Jeronimus Spengler
- Anita Spinelli
- Adolf Stäbli
- Otto Staiger
- Karl Stauffer-Bern
- Johann Gottfried Steffan
- David Eduard Steiner
- Eduard Stiefel
- Tobias Stimmer
- Ernst Stückelberg
- Bernhard Studer
- Frédéric Studer
- Hans Sturzenegger
- Max Sulzbachner

== T ==
- Sophie Taeuber-Arp
- Gaudenz Taverna
- André Thomkins
- Jean Tinguely
- Anna Maria Tobler
- Wolfgang-Adam Töpffer
- Niele Toroni
- Albert Trachsel
- Anne Marie Trechslin
- Johann Heinrich Troll
- Otto Tschumi

== V ==
- Giovanni Antonio Vanoni
- Benjamin Vautier
- Auguste Veillon
- Egon von Vietinghoff
- René Villiger
- Julius Voegtli
- Ludwig Vogel
- Denise Voïta
- Joseph Simon Volmar

== W ==
- Andreas Walser
- Karl Walser
- Anna Waser
- August Weckesser
- Walter Wegmüller
- Johann Caspar Weidenmann
- Charlotte Weiss
- Albert Welti
- Albert J. Welti
- Lisa Wenger
- Marianne von Werefkin
- Joseph Werner
- Hans Beat Wieland
- Walter Kurt Wiemken
- Jean Willi
- Uwe Wittwer
- Emanuel Witz
- Konrad Witz
- Caspar Wolf
- Theodor Wolf
- Adolf Wölfli
- Fritz Wucherer
- Melchior Wyrsch
- Franz Anatol Wyss
- Bruno Weber

== Z ==
- Eugen Zardetti
- Rémy Zaugg
- Adrian Zingg
- Robert Zünd
- Markus Zürcher
- Irène Zurkinden

== Sources ==
- German Wikipedia
