= Claude Sandoz =

Swiss visual artist (b. 1946)

- Born: 14 March 1946 (age 79); Zürich, Switzerland
- Education: School of Design Bern and Biel, School of Arts and Crafts Bielefeld
- Known for: painting, murals, public art
- Style: Visual

Claude Sandoz (born 14 March 1946) is a Swiss visual artist. He has worked in painting, drawing, mural painting, stained glass, graphics, public art, watercolor, and printmaking.

== Biography ==
Claude Sandoz was born in 1946 in Zürich, Switzerland. He attended the School of Design Bern and Biel (German: Schule für Gestaltung Bern und Biel); and the School of Arts and Crafts Bielefeld (German: Handwerker- und Kunstgewerbeschule Bielefeld) from 1964 to 1966. Sandoz was a student of Max von Mühlenen. He continued his studies in Rome and Amsterdam.

In 1983, he was awarded the Manor Cultural Prize in the Canton of Lucerne.

His work is in museum collections, including part of the British Museum, Migros Museum of Contemporary Art, and the Museum zu Allerheiligen Schaffhausen.

== See also ==
- List of Swiss painters
