= Sordet =

Sordet is a surname. Notable people with the surname include:

- André Sordet (1852–1923), French Commandeur of the Légion d'honneur
- Caroline Sophie Sordet-Boissonnas (1859–1943), Swiss painter
- Clément Sordet (born 1992), French golfer
