= Henzen =

Henzen is a surname. Notable people with the surname include:

- Andreas Henzen (born 1955), Swiss painter
- Charles Henzen (born 1945), Swiss ice hockey player
- Wilhelm Henzen (1816–1887), German philologist and epigraphist

== See also ==
- Henze
