= Edmond de Palézieux =

Swiss painter (1850–1924)

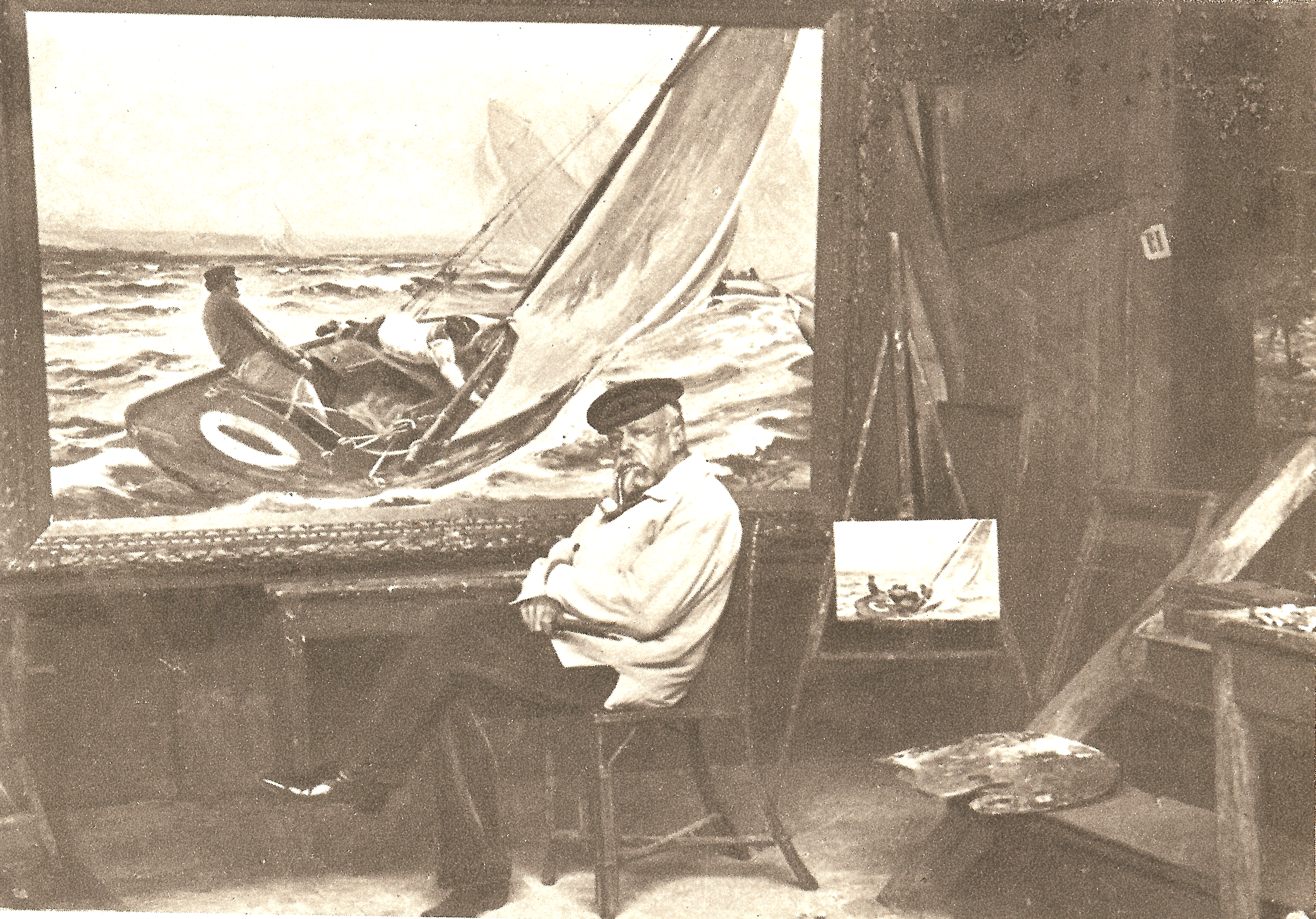
Edmond de Palézieux in his studio with "Souvenir de régates"

Edmond Henri Théodore de Palézieux, nicknamed Falconnet (20 July 1850, Vevey - 11 June 1924, Équihen-Plage) was a Swiss marine painter, known for his dramatic scenes of sailors fighting the elements. He was also an amateur sailor and navigator.

== Biography ==
He originally wanted to join the Navy, but his family refused permission, so he searched for another occupation that would allow him to travel and chose painting. He became a student of Barthélemy Menn, whose style left permanent traces in Palézieux's work. Menn also encouraged him to practice painting en plein aire. Later, he went to Paris, where he studied with Jean-Paul Laurens and made the acquaintance of Fernand Cormon.

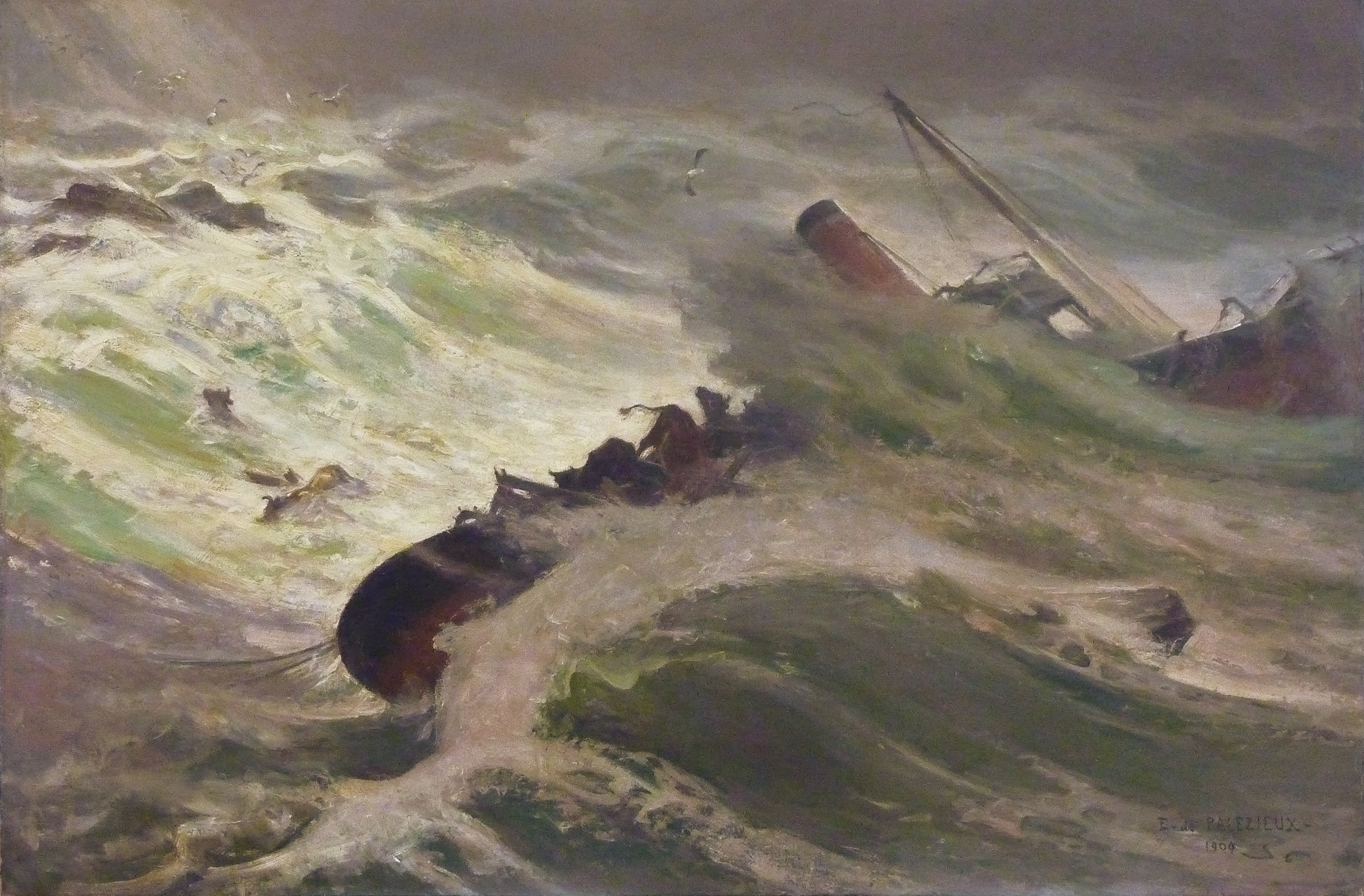
Lost (1909)

After a brief visit to Düsseldorf, he returned home and married Lily Olmsted, with whom he had a daughter. His family made frequent visits to Brittany and Normandy. Many of his works were inspired by sights on the shores of Lake Geneva.

During the 1880s, he made numerous trips to Paris, where he socialized with some of his fellow painters from Switzerland, including Eugène Burnand, Charles Giron and Evert van Muyden. He also held regular exhibitions at the Salon des artistes français, which received generally good reviews.

In 1903, after separating from his wife, he settled permanently in Équihen-Plage, near Boulogne-sur-Mer. Four years later, after his divorce was finalized, he married Suzanne Lair. This marriage produced no children. In 1910, he was named a Chevalier in the French Legion of Honor.

The First World War forced him and his wife to remove themselves from their proximity to the battle zones. They spent time in Vevey, near Lake Annecy and in the south of France; Collioure in particular, but also in Antibes and Saint-Jean-de-Luz. He left each of these places with numerous new maritime paintings and sketches. They were finally able to return to Équihen-Plage in 1919, and he remained there for the rest of his life. In his final years, he displayed some nostalgia for his homeland; notably a painting entitled "Souvenir de régates" (now lost), where he depicts himself manning a racing boat in Lake Geneva. He was interred in the village cemetery.

A major retrospective was held at the Lake Geneva Museum in 2014. In addition to his paintings, several of his working models were displayed.

== The sailor ==
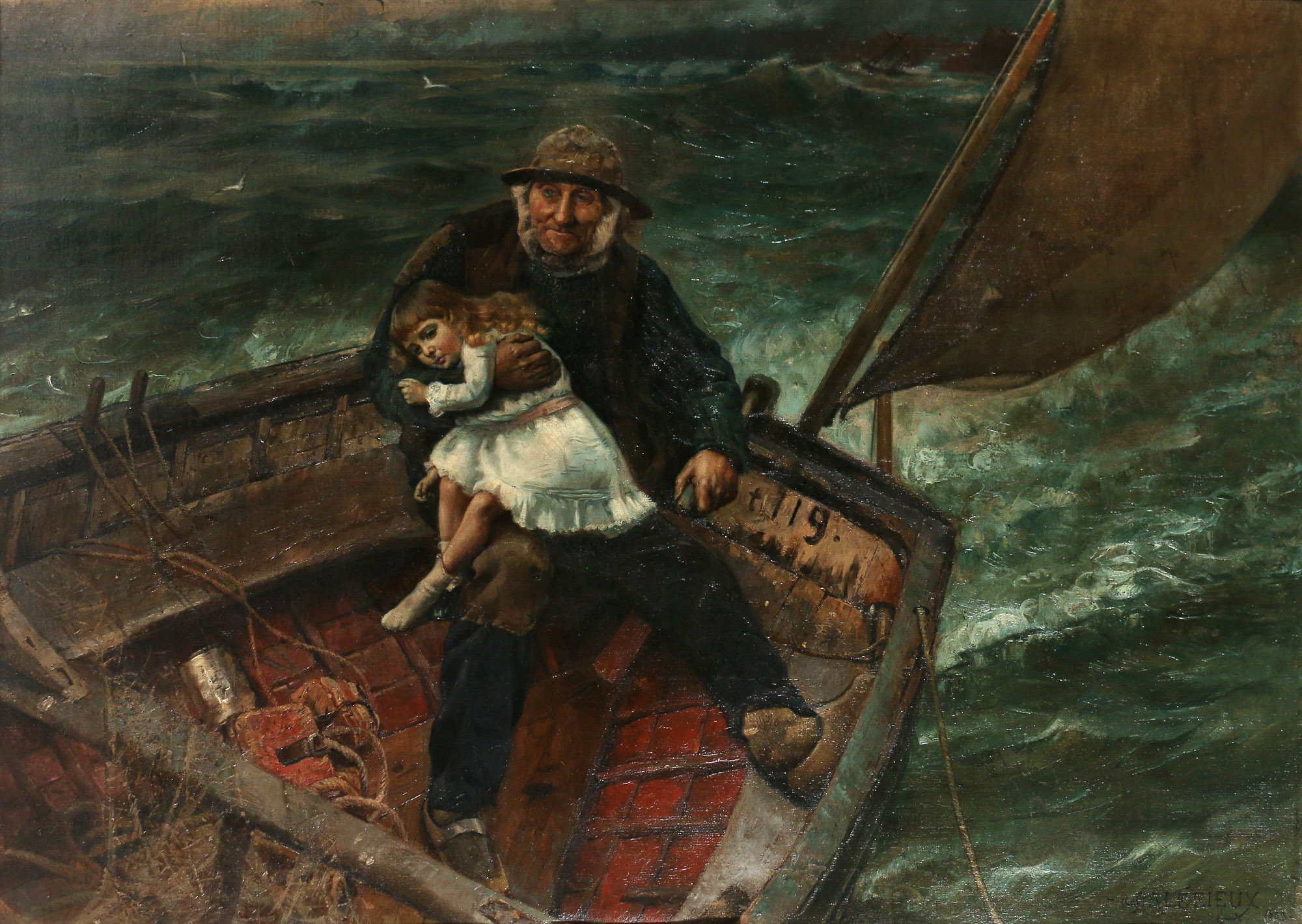
The Rescue Ship (1885)

He had been passionate about sailing and navigating since he was a young boy and learned how to manage a sailboat at the age of twelve. Although his family was opposed to sailing as a career, he took boats out on Lake Geneva as often as possible. In 1888, he commanded the "Petrel", a ship belonging to Baron Jules de Catus (1838-1910), who was a naval architect. In 1890, he had a ship built and named it the "Flirt". It was a racing boat which he used to participate in regattas on Lake Geneva.

His involvement in sailing can be seen in his works, where there is a meticulous accuracy of detail, not only in the boats themselves, but in the navigational maneuvers as well.
