= Anita Spinelli =

Swiss artist, painter and drawer

- Born: Anita Corti; 8 January 1908; Balerna, Switzerland
- Died: 24 March 2010 (aged 102); Mendrisio, Switzerland
- Education: Brera Academy, Milan
- Style: Expressionist

Anita Spinelli (8 January 1908 – 24 March 2010) was a Swiss artist, painter and drawer also known for her approaches to graphic work.

== Life ==
Spinelli was born Anita Corti, in Balerna, Ticino Switzerland in 1908, the third child of four to Gemma and Gaetano Corti. She was initiated to art quite early. Her father, a businessman in wine making, patronised several artists. After middle school she attended the Arts and Crafts School in Lugano and Guido Gonzato's studio.

Defying conventions and her family, she registered at the Brera Academy of Art in Milan, attended Aldo Carpi's special courses in painting and graduated in 1933. During this period she immersed herself in the buoyant artistic life of Milan, travelled to Paris and Vienna and visited Assisi, where she lived in the monastery to study Giotto's frescos. In 1932 she married Paolo Spinelli, a civil servant and landowner with whom she had two daughters. They moved to the mansion of Pignora, Novazzano in Ticino, where she lived and worked for most of her life. She became an active member of the Society of Swiss Artists, Sculptors and Architects and set out her place in an artistic scene dominated by men. Invited to the XIX and XX National Art Exhibits of 1936 and 1941 her work was remarked on for her innovative mode of expression. She had her first solo exhibit in 1938 in Lausanne.

To overcome regional and cultural isolation she engaged after World War II until the 1990s in extended travelling in the Mediterranean Basin and Europe, Africa, Central America and China with repeated and prolonged stays in the US. These travels were important sources of inspiration and have influenced her perception of light and space, which are central elements of her art.

During her stay in Mainz, Germany, in the early 1970s she took up engraving techniques again, neglected since art school, and through her novel approach this became a significant part of her work.

Later on, Spinelli also engaged in art-science projects initiated by the Lausanne University department of neurology with the task to render and visualize neurological disorders, medical gestures and different forms of pain through her artistic approach. The themes treated were "The Hand in Neurology" (1987), "Dizziness and Mouvement" (1995), "Headache|Headaches and Faces" (1992) and resulted in several exhibits and publications. The confrontation of two fundamentally different dimensions of reality (the scientific approach that aims at evidence, and the artistic and sensitive approach that elicits the invisible but maintains a mystery) paradoxically revealed certain complementaries and the capacity of art to shed light on scientific phenomena and vice versa.

She regularly showed her work in personal and collective exhibitions in institutional and private spaces. In 2002 a permanent display of her work has been created at the "Quadreria" in Novazzano, Ticino. Her last major retrospective was organized by the Museum of Art of Lugano in 2008.

Anita Spinelli died on 24 March 2010 in Mendrisio of the consequences of an accident that occurred in her studio. She had continued to create art until her death.

Her work is represented in museums, as well as in institutional and private collections in Switzerland and elsewhere.

== Work ==
Spinelli's media were mainly oil paintings of different formats, engravings and mixed techniques, in which she elaborated her graphic work with colour and ink. In the large oil formats of her latter period she deployed diptychs and triptychs.

Spinelli's work explores individual and societal questions that characterized her long life as an actor and witness of the 20th and early 21st century. She appears to have attached a central importance to the human figure caught in everyday situations and attitudes. Her work roots in reality, an everyday reality that she transforms through imaginative accelerations into figures, mental figures, to capture another more hidden reality. According to Berger, Spinelli's work can be read on at least three levels of analysis: the first is her look that is not purely visual but involves participation; a further level, is that of self-reflection – she takes position with humour or irony, with joy or grief; on a third level, she elaborates existential questions. The quests and existential conditions, which encompass the very essence of human life, make up the core of her subjects: hope, joy but also loneliness, silence, memory, fear, separation, oppression, war and hardship. She expresses the interior sentience of being. In Spinelli's words:

"It is silent, curious listening: a search for the essence of the object, stripped of the superfluous, with hard work and without complacency. To make art means to me being alive among the living. My characters are myself. With them I share the load of good and evil. You cannot cheat."

Her work spanning over almost a century, Spinelli has addressed and analysed the formal debates of her time. She explored from metaphysics to post-cubist deconstruction, from expressionism to abstractionism (in particular abstract expressionism) to new forms of figuration, however never adhering completely to any one of these positions. Rather she synthesized and bent them freely to her needs. Spinelli developed a pictorial code characterized by vivid chromatics, dynamism, a wide freedom and complexity in composition, determined by simultaneity and disruption of perspective, where the figure emerges from an abstract spatiality. Spinelli's language is considered expressionist in nature, but where a visionary spirit superposes or coexists with the tragic element.

In her last period, her color-light rarefies to a metaphysical dimension of pure light, transparency and lightness. Her novel approaches, the sense of freedom and of expressive possibilities together with a constant poetic and ethical tension mark her contribution to the art world.
