= Adolf Stäbli =

Swiss painter (1842–1901)

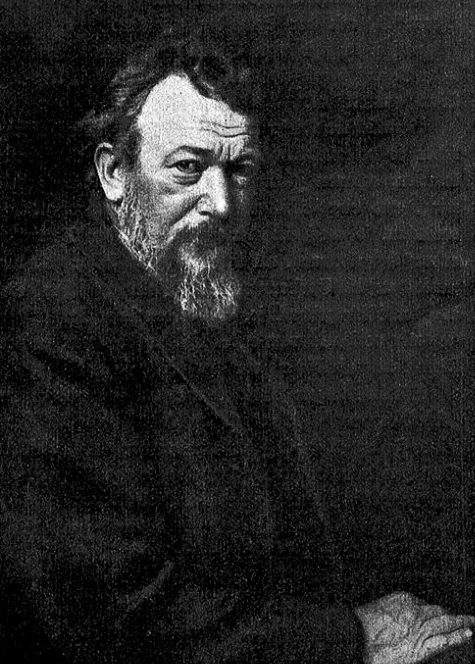
Adolf Stäbli (1900)

Johann Adolf Stäbli (31 May 1842 – 21 September 1901) was a Swiss painter in the late Romantic who was best known for his "Stimmungslandschaften" (Mood landscapes).

== Biography ==
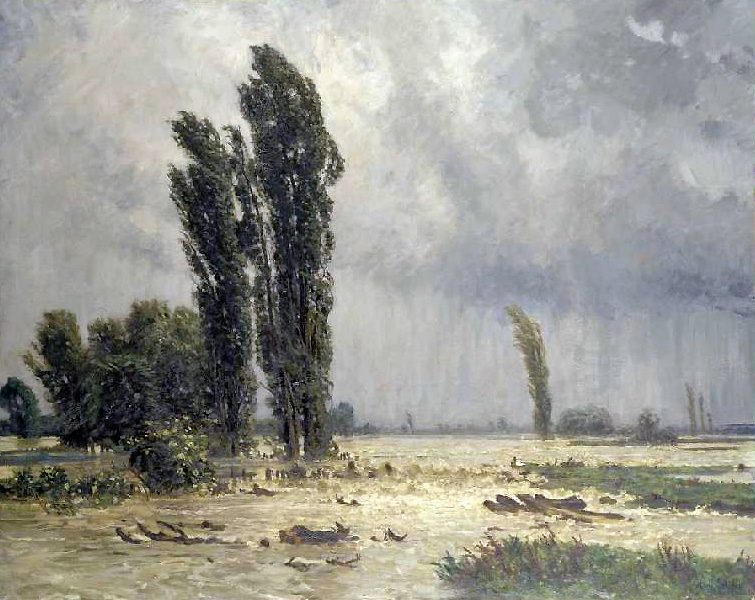
Flooding (1880s)

Stäbli was born in Winterthur. His father, Diethelm (1812-1868), was an engraver who originally came from Brugg in Aargau. He left school at the age of sixteen to begin studies with his father. From 1859 to 1861, he was apprenticed to Rudolf Koller in Zürich. Upon Koller's recommendation, he continued his studies with Johann Wilhelm Schirmer at the Academy of Fine Arts, Karlsruhe, where he met and befriended Hans Thoma.

Later, he visited Dresden, Milan and Paris, where he came into contact with French landscape painting at the Exposition Universelle (1867) and visited the artists' colony at Barbizon. After his father's death, he settled permanently in Munich; becoming part of a circle of Swiss artists that included Arnold Böcklin and Otto Frölicher as well as the art historian, Adolf Bayersdorfer. In 1882, he made a lengthy visit to Italy. He generally made sketches en plein aire during the summer and turned them into paintings at his studio in the winter. One of his best known works "Rising Thunderstorm" was painted on commission by the government of Aargau and may be seen at the Aargauer Kunsthaus.

He was always prone to depression. After 1882, he began to suffer the effects of alcoholism and chloroform inhalation; resulting in periods of stagnation and poverty. By 1894, his health was permanently damaged. However, after a period of recovery, he received gold medals in 1897 and 1901 and was awarded an honorary Professorship by Prince Regent Luitpold in 1898.

After his death i Munich, most of his remaining works were returned to Switzerland, although some may be seen in Munich at the Neue Pinakothek. Major retrospectives were held in 1942 (Aarau), 1984 (Brugg) and 2015 at the Aargauer Kunsthaus.

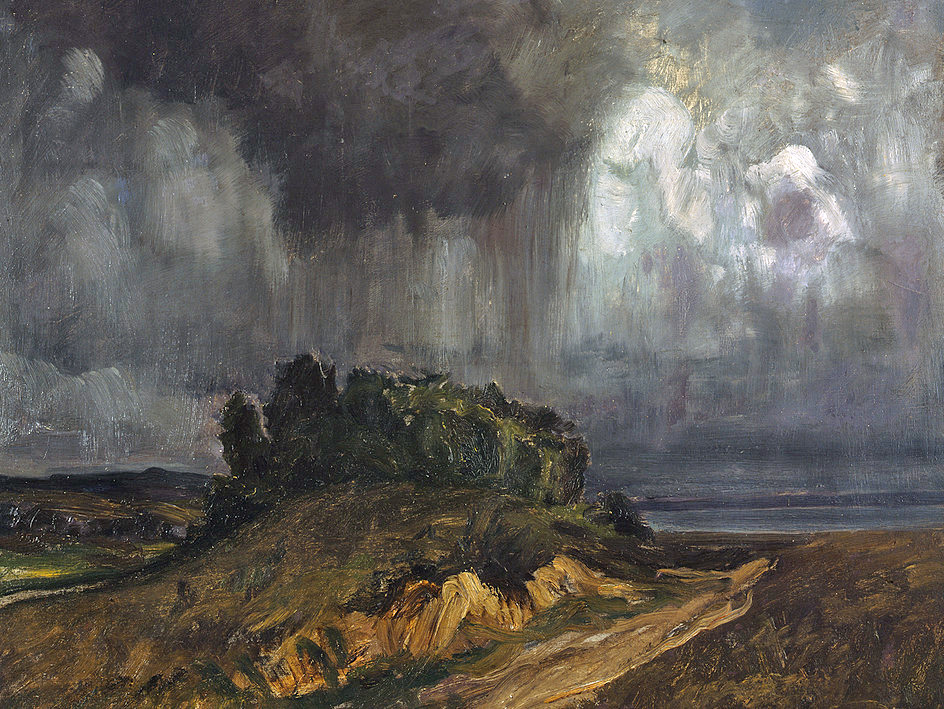
Storm (1895)
