= Frédéric Studer =

Frédéric Studer (1926–2005) was a Swiss painter.

He has published collections of drawings, illustrated books and, in 1971, produced a short animated film.

He has participated in numerous national and international caricature exhibitions and also exhibited his drawings in Switzerland.
