= Karl Pümpin =

Swiss painter

Karl Pümpin (1907–1975) was a Swiss painter.

== CV (Curriculum vitae) ==
Karl Pümpin was born in Gelterkinden (2 April 1907) as a son of an agriculturist/farmer. He went to the district school of Böckten and the agricultural school in Liestal. During his year in the French part of Switzerland he worked at a carpenter. He realized his passion for working with wood and so he built a workshop with machines in his farm for that matter. His military service he absolved in Schachen (Aarau) and he served as a cavalryman. 1933 he married Rosa Marti, the daughter of a farmer from the Himmelsgrund Häfelfingen. With her he had the 4 children Annarös, Margrit, Karl and Lotti.

== Career ==
His career as a painter was self-educated. Different painters of the region exchanged their experiences in painting. Pümpin discovered his passion for impressionism. Already during his youth he went painting outdoor in nature with his cousin Fritz Pümpin. While Fritz learned the occupation of an art-painter, Karl kept it as a hobby. He exposed his paintings in the barn of the farm where his works got big interests. He also showed them at the "Province Basel Promotion Of Art" ("Basellandschaftliche Kunstförderung") and sold some pieces. This is why he got known as “The Painting Farmer”.

He painted preferably in oil colours with brush and scraper. There also exist some drawings in charcoal. Pümpin couldn’t deepen (intensify) his talent because he had to work on the farm of his father.

Karl Pümpin died 9 April 1975 in Gelterkinden, Switzerland.
