= Hans Krüsi =

Swiss painter

Hans Krusi
- Born: 15 April 1920; St. Gallen, Switzerland
- Died: 9 September 1995 (aged 75); St. Gallen, Switzerland

Hans Krüsi (15 April 1920 – 9 September 1995) was a Swiss painter. He is considered an important representative of Art brut.

== Life ==
Krüsi was born the illegitimate child of Emma Krüsi and grew up with foster parents in Speicher. After a brief education and a few years of work as a farmhand and gardener in different parts of Switzerland, he moved to St. Gallen in 1947 and became a flower salesman. His precarious living conditions and weak constitution led him in the autumn of 1968 to commit himself to a six-month recovery course on the Walenstadtberg.

In 1975, he began pursuing a career in photography and painting. He mainly painted on free materials such as wrapping paper, cardboard, or napkins. His preferred motifs, all taken from his immediate environment, were animals, especially cows. Krüsi began selling his own drawings and paintings at his flower stand in Zurich. He was so successful that he soon made more money with his paintings than with his flowers. He died of emphysema in September 1995.

At the beginning of 1981, the Buchmann Galerie in St. Gallen exhibited his paintings for the first time. As a result of press coverage, Krüsi was soon able to give up his flower stand and devote himself entirely to artistic creation. In addition to around 4,000 pictures and drawings, Krüsi's legacy includes a large number of photographs, negatives, tapes, collages, as well as a number of prose texts and poems.

On September 19, 2009, Krüsi's radio play "Ich kann ohne Esel nicht sein" was broadcast on Deutschlandfunk.
