= Carlo E. Lischetti =

Swiss painter (1946-2005)

- Born: Carlo Edoardo Lischetti; 18 October 1946; Brugg, Switzerland
- Died: 30 November 2005 (aged 59); Bern, Switzerland
- Occupations: Artist, politician
- Known for: Performance art, painting, sculpture, film, video
- Spouse: Barbara Greber

Carlo Edoardo Lischetti (18 October 1946 – 30 November 2005) was a Swiss multidisciplinary artist and local politician. His work combined performance, wordplay and interventions in public space. In 1992, he created Keine Brunnenfigur ("No Fountain Figure"), a platform at Bern’s Postgasse fountain where members of the public could become the fountain figure and speak. He also served on Bern’s city council from 1973 to 1976.

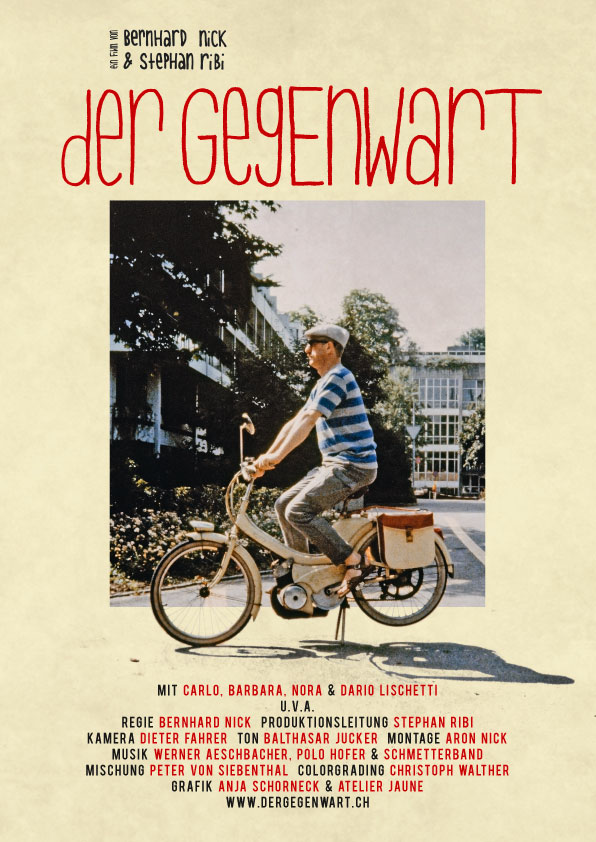
Poster for Der Gegenwart (2014)

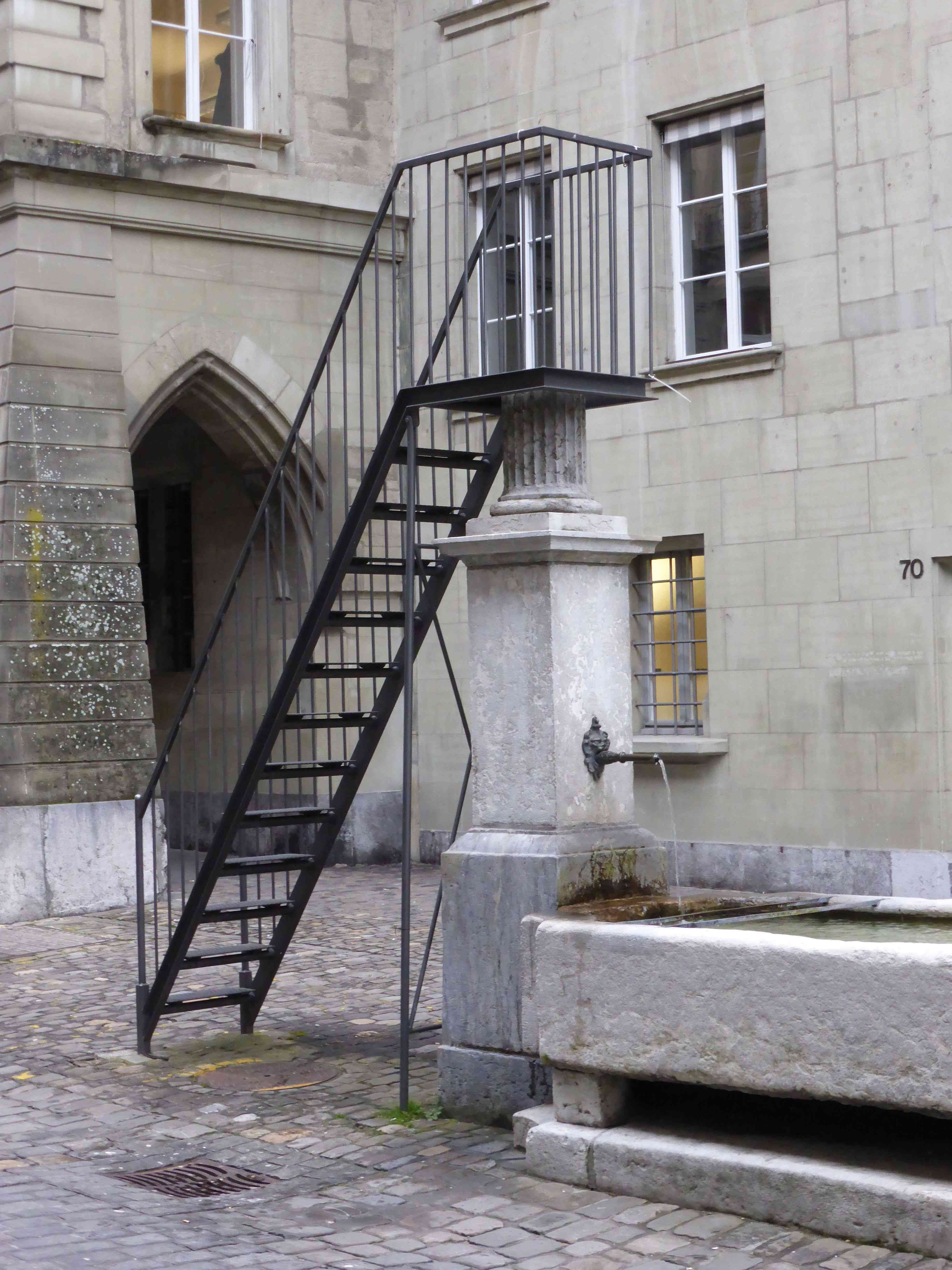
Lischetti fountain, Bern

== Biography ==
Carlo E. Lischetti was born on 18 October 1946 in Brugg. After training as a decorator in Zurich, he moved to Bern in 1966. His apartment on Kramgasse was used as the Laboratorium für angewandte Umweltgestaltung ("Laboratory for Applied Environmental Design") and became a meeting place for the city’s alternative scene.

Lischetti initially worked as a decorator at the Loeb department store before turning to writing and action art. He founded Büro Lischetti in 1971. That year, he contested the Bern city council election on the Härdlütli list. The campaign included a poster showing the candidates nude, and his election was described as an artistic action. Lischetti held a council seat from 1973 to 1976.

In 1983, Lischetti married the lawyer Barbara Greber, with whom he had two children. He received an award from the City of Bern Art Commission in 1996. He died by suicide in Bern on 30 November 2005.

== Work ==
Lischetti was a multidisciplinary artist whose practice included painting, sculpture, performance, film and video. Wordplay was a recurring feature of his art. He created new expressions and assumed invented roles, including der Gegenwart.

In 1992, Lischetti created Keine Brunnenfigur ("No Fountain Figure") at the Postgasse fountain in Bern. Rather than placing a permanent statue on the fountain, he installed a platform where members of the public could take the position of the figure and speak. The work was conceived as a Bernese counterpart to Hyde Park Corner in London and became known locally as the Lischetti fountain. At its inauguration, Lischetti climbed onto the platform wearing armour before removing it in a performance he called Abrüstung ("Disarmament").

Other projects included a perpetual calendar made from a single sheet bearing the word Heute ("Today") and a public artwork near Bern's Bärengraben featuring dancing street cleaners, intended to honour the municipal workers who cleaned the city during the Zibelemärit. His work is represented in collections including the Kunstmuseum Bern, the Cantonal Art Archive in Bern and the Böhm Collection at Centre PasquArt in Biel.

The 2014 documentary Der Gegenwart examined Lischetti’s life and work using archival material and interviews with his children and people who had known him. It also set his personal story against the artistic and political currents of his time.
