= Maria Herrmann-Kaufmann =

Swiss painter

- Born: 19 January 1921; Escholzmatt, Switzerland
- Died: 16 January 2008 (aged 86); Emmenbrücke, Switzerland
- Known for: Painting

Maria Herrmann-Kaufmann (19 January 1921 - 16 January 2008 ) was a Swiss painter.

== Life ==
Maria Herrmann-Kaufmann was born and raised in Escholzmatt in Entlebuch. Her second home was Emmenbrücke, a suburb of Lucerne. She created the bulk of her works in her studio in the Quartier Sprengi.

Herrmann-Kaufmann received her training at the School of Design, Lucerne and the Académie de la Grande Chaumière, Paris. She studied with Ronald Kocher, Otto Kuhn, Alfred Sidler, Fred Stauffer (Bern) and Adolf Weber (Menziken).

After 1956, she exhibited her works in numerous individual and group exhibitions in Bern, Lucerne, Emmenbrücke, Zug, Buchrain, Kriens, Flühli-Sörenberg, Schüpfheim, Porrentruy, Mendrisio, Escholzmatt and Osnabrück.

Her artworks are signed with the initials MHK. A large part of her works is in private or public ownership. The artistic estate is managed by a foundation.

She died on 16 January 2008 at the ALP ancillary center in Emmenbrücke.
