= Charlotte Weiss =

Swiss painter

Charlotte Marie Weiss ( June 4, 1870, Basel – December 29, 1961, Herrliberg) was a Swiss painter.
