= Anna Maria Tobler =

Swiss artist (1882-1935)

Anna Maria Tobler (1882–1935) was a Swiss painter.

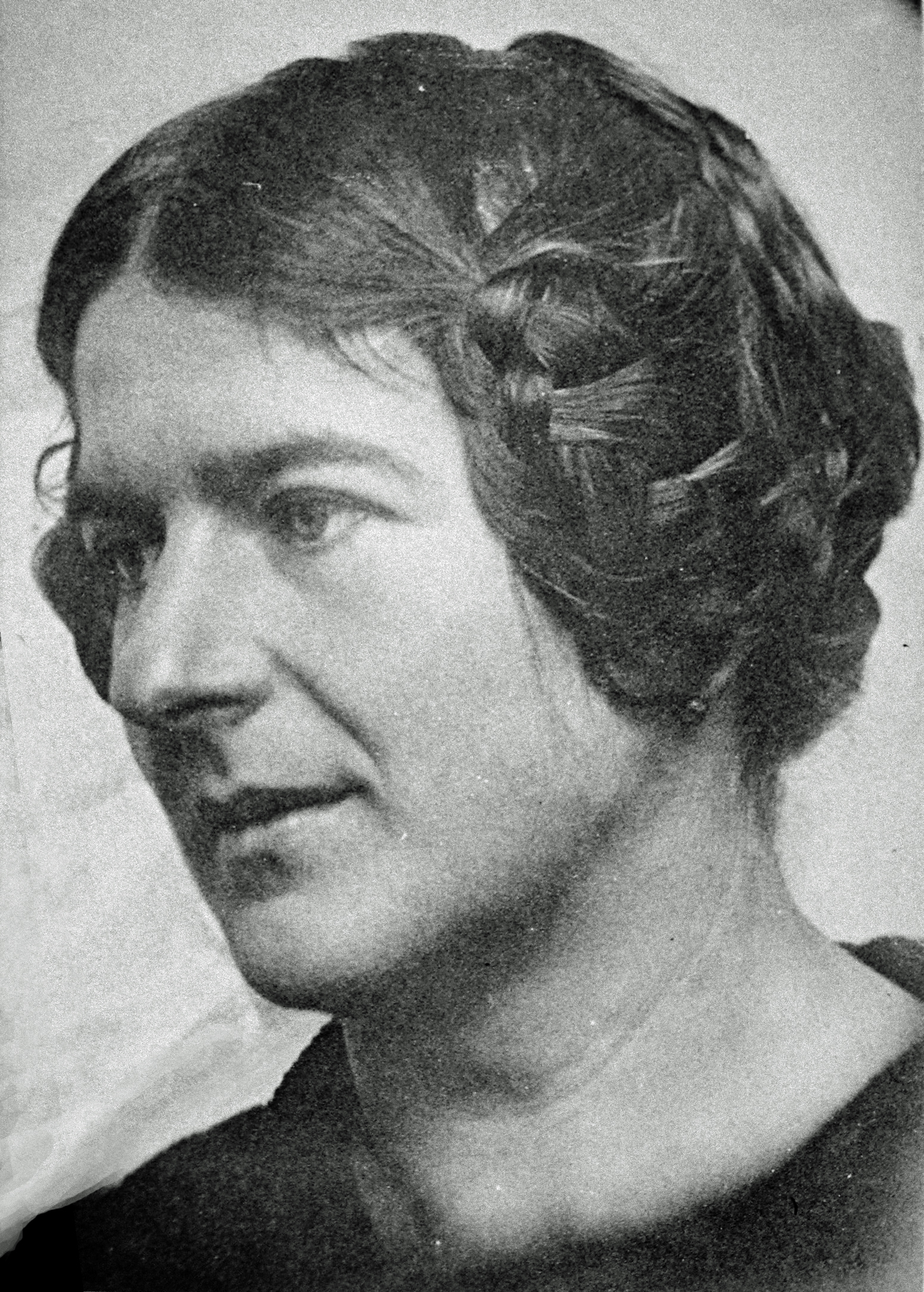
Anna Maria Tobler
