= Klaus Bietenholz =

Swiss painter

Klaus Bietenholz (December 29, 1924 – 23 May 2015) was a Swiss painter of "Organic Cubism Art". Over the years he painted over 300 art pieces. An admirer of Paul Klee, Juan Gris, Alexander Calder, and César Manrique, his painting reflect a mastery of colors and intricate composition.

Beside his occupation as a painter, Klaus Bietenholz was a sound and light engineer, involved in film-making in the late 1950s and early 1960s for Praesens-Film and director Franz Schnyder (Geld und geist 1966, Heidi und Peter). Co-founder of the Sound Studio "Proton" in Zürich, he successfully worked on thousands of projects such as feature films, advertising, film and radio spots and broadcasting. Klaus lived and worked in Zürich, Switzerland. His daughter Barbara Bietenholz is also a painter.
