= Hermann Hirzel =

Swiss artist and jewelry designer (1864–1939)

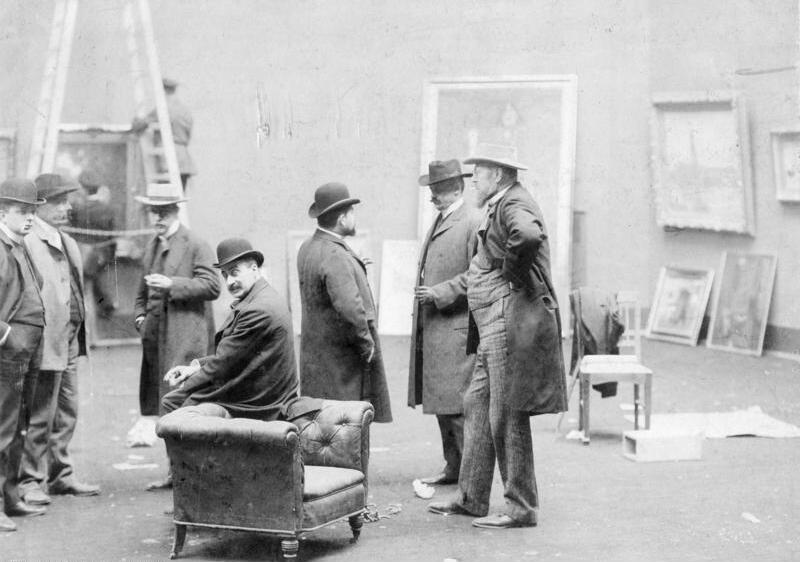
Paul Cassirer, Lovis Corinth, Hermann Hirzel, Prof. Max Liebermann, Fritz Klimsch, and Leopold von Kalkreuth preparing the Berlin Secession.

Hermann Hirzel (1864–1939) was a Swiss painter. He studied for some years at the Academy of Arts, Berlin. He also lived in Italy and Sicily. Some of the works were presented at the Gurlitt's Winter Exhibitions. His etchings and drawings demonstrated his love of nature. Hirzel even branched out into doing commercial wrappers and covers for music.
