= Francesco Antonio Giorgioli =

Swiss painter (c.1655–1725)

- Born: c. 1655; Meride, Switzerland
- Died: 15 November 1725 (aged 69–70); Meride, Switzerland
- Known for: Religious fresco painting
- Movement: Baroque

Crucifixion of Christ, fresco by Giorgioli in the church of Pfäfers Abbey

Francesco Antonio Giorgioli (c. 1655 – 15 November 1725) was a Swiss painter of the Baroque period. He was known for religious fresco painting and created major works for churches and abbeys in Switzerland and southern Germany. His work was an important early contribution to Italian Baroque fresco painting in Switzerland.

== Biography ==
Francesco Antonio Giorgioli was born around 1655 in Meride. His father, Giovan Pietro, was a woodcarver and sculptor. Giorgioli married Margherita Roncati in 1677. He probably trained as a painter in Milan, where he is recorded in 1678. From 1680 to 1683, he worked in Rome and also spent time in Florence.

In 1687, Giorgioli travelled through Venice and Vienna before reaching Warsaw, where he collaborated with his brother Carlo Giuseppe, a stucco artist. While in Warsaw, he served as a court painter. His travels in Germany during 1691–1692 included Eisenberg, Coburg and Weimar. He married Jacoba Vassalli in 1695. Giorgioli died in Meride on 15 November 1725.

== Work ==
Altar paintings by Giorgioli in St Fridolin's Minster, Säckingen

Ceiling fresco by Giorgioli in St Fridolin's Minster, Säckingen

Giorgioli was a painter whose works were predominantly religious in subject. He was a prolific fresco painter. In 1686, a commission took him to the Chapel of San Carlo Borromeo near Lostallo, where he decorated the ceiling in fresco. He received a commission in Pavia in 1692 and also worked at the Chapel of Sant'Elia in Viggiù. Among his major church commissions were groups of oil paintings for the Benedictine churches at Pfäfers in 1694, Muri around 1705 and Rheinau in 1708–1709. Around the turn of the 18th century, he had established himself among Switzerland's leading fresco painters.

After his earlier work at Pfäfers, Giorgioli was commissioned in 1707 to create the ceiling frescoes at Rheinau Abbey. He completed the work in 1709, producing 24 paintings based on the abbey's planned programme of religious subjects. These were painted primarily onto fresh plaster, with some details added later on dry plaster (al secco). The Rheinau frescoes survive without later alteration. The principal frescoes in the nave are devoted to the veneration of Mary, to whom the church is dedicated. The side aisles contain a series depicting the life and Passion of Christ. In the Gloria Omnium Sanctorum fresco at Rheinau Abbey, Giorgioli depicted himself as a beggar kneeling beside Saint Martin.

At Säckingen, Giorgioli painted a series of 80 ceiling frescoes in 1701. His 1701 frescoes there survive visibly only in the two octagonal chapels. In 1721, he received the commission for all of the altar paintings in St Fridolin's Minster. Also in 1721, he painted Classical subjects for a pavilion in the grounds of Schloss Schönan. During the 1750s remodelling of St Fridolin's Minster, Giorgioli's frescoes in the choir were covered by new stucco decoration. Some of his frescoes remain preserved beneath the later decoration, including in the choir. He often worked alongside stucco artists from Ticino. Giorgioli was an important early representative of Italian Baroque fresco painting in Switzerland.
