= Charles Giron =

Swiss painter and art critic

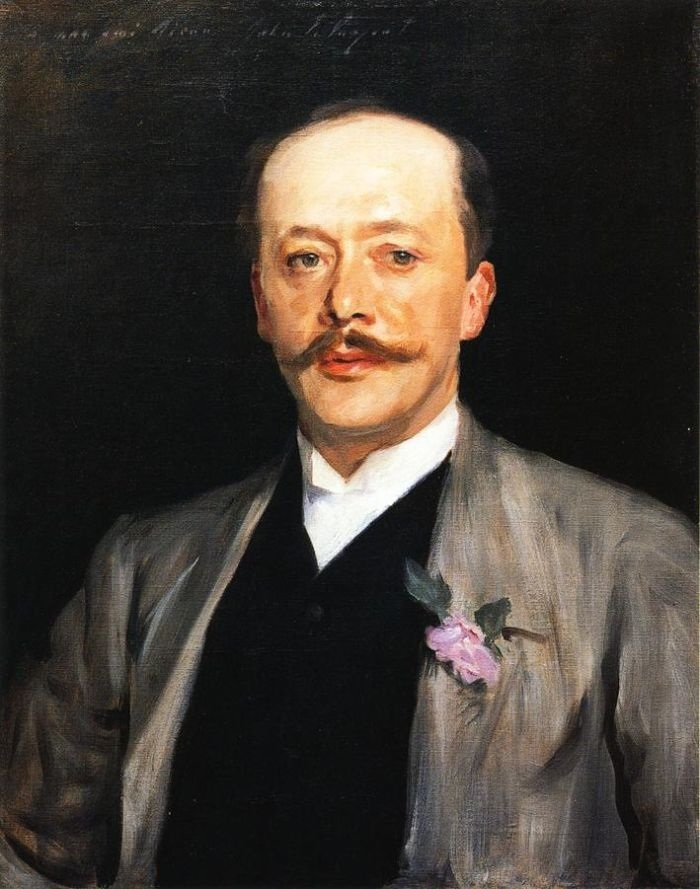
Charles Giron; portrait by John Singer Sargent

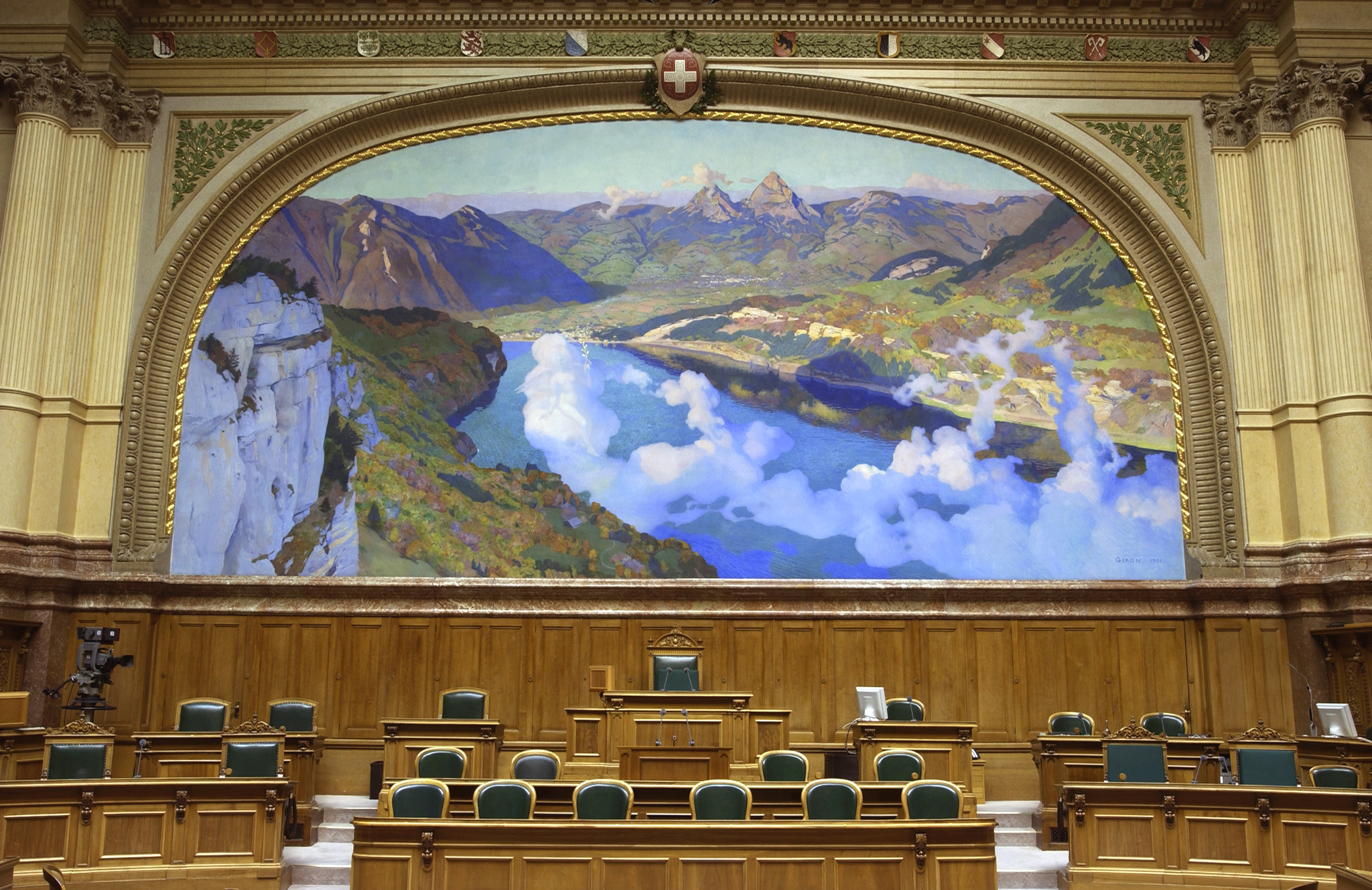
Mural at the National Council

Charles Alexandre Giron (2 April 1850 – 9 June 1914) was a Swiss painter and art critic. He specialized in portraits and scenes with figures, some of them mildly humorous.

== Biography ==
Giron was born on 2 April 1850 in Geneva. His father, Antoine-Alexandre Giron, was a Catholic from Spain who came to Switzerland via Sardinia and his mother, Marie Henriod, was a Huguenot from Neuchâtel.

Initially, Giron was apprenticed to an enameler but decided to become an artist instead. He began by taking lessons from François Diday and Barthélemy Menn in Geneva. In 1872, he went to Paris, where he frequented the Hôtel de Nice, a boarding house on the Rue des Beaux-Arts that was home to some painters from Switzerland. Later, he shared several studios with Max Leenhardt. His first exhibition at the Salon came in 1876 and consisted mostly of landscapes. Eventually, he found a position in the studios of Alexandre Cabanel at the École des Beaux-Arts.

During his time in France, Giron travelled extensively, visiting England, the Netherlands, and Italy. A planned tour of India, sponsored by the Maharajah of Baroda, failed to materialize. Giron was awarded the Order of Leopold in 1887 and, the following year, was named a Chevalier in the Legion of Honor. In 1891, he married Jeanne Antoinette Forget, the daughter of a merchant. They had three children. Their daughter, Simone, married into the noble Pourtalès family.

After being active in Paris and Cannes, Giron and his family returned to Switzerland in 1896 and lived in several locations before settling in Genthod. In his capacity as an art critic, he came to the defense of Ferdinand Hodler when Hodler's controversial proposal for frescoes in the Weapons Room at the Swiss National Museum was rejected. Giron sat on the admissions jury for the Exposition Universelle (1900). In 1901, he created murals for the National Council in Bern. From 1898 to 1912, he served several terms on the Eidgenössische Kunstkommission (Federal Fine Arts Commission). In 1913, Giron suffered a stroke that left him unable to paint. He died on 9 June 1914 in Genthod.

Two major retrospectives have been held: Zürich-Geneva in 1920 and Bern in 1955. A street in Geneva is named after him.

== Selected paintings ==
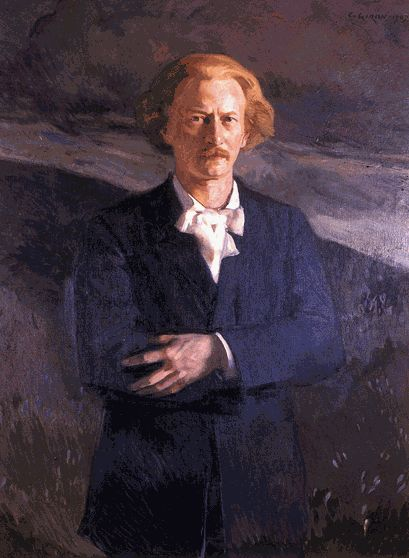
Portrait of Paderewski

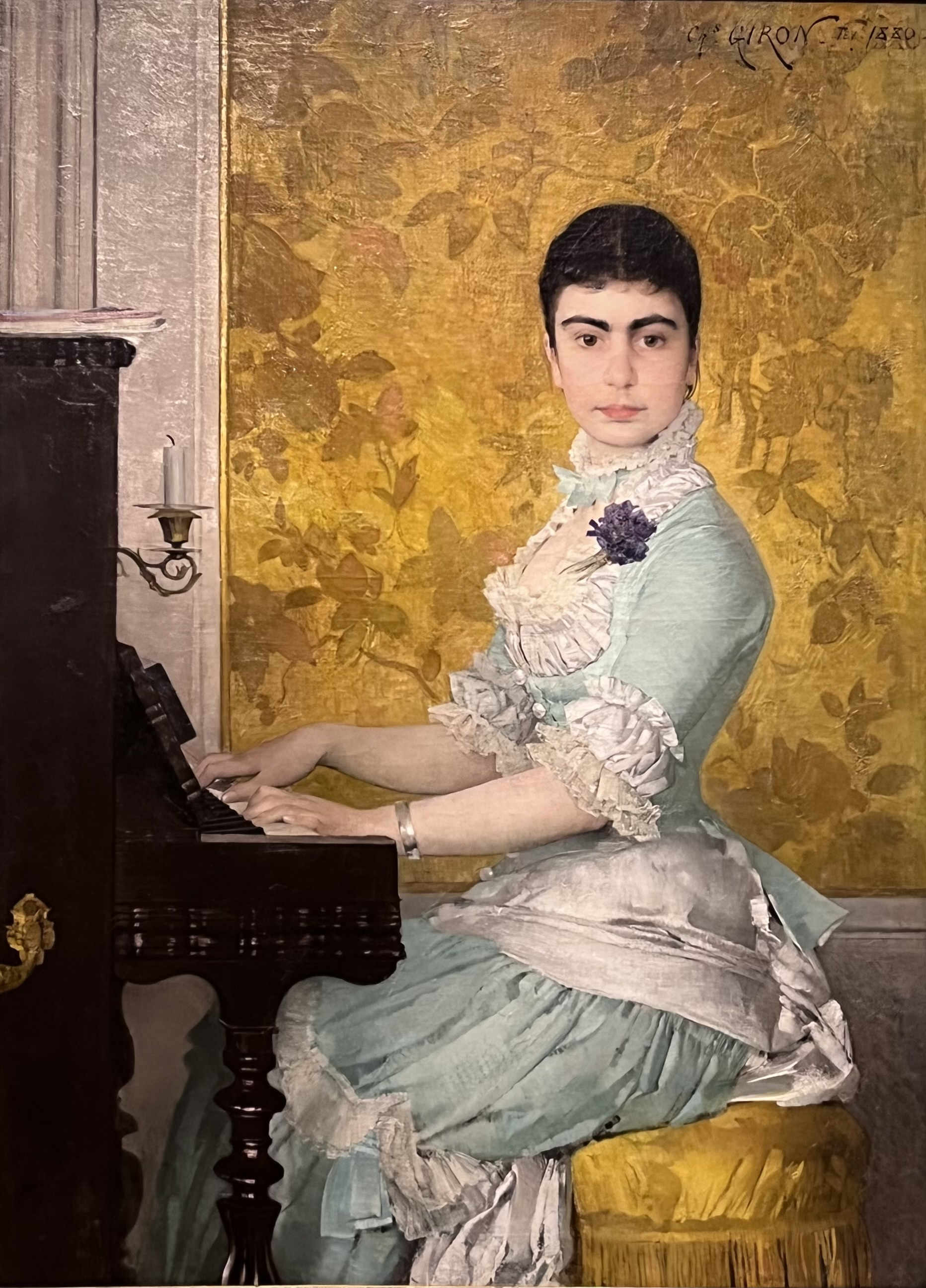
Portrait of Miss Maguie D. or Lady at the piano

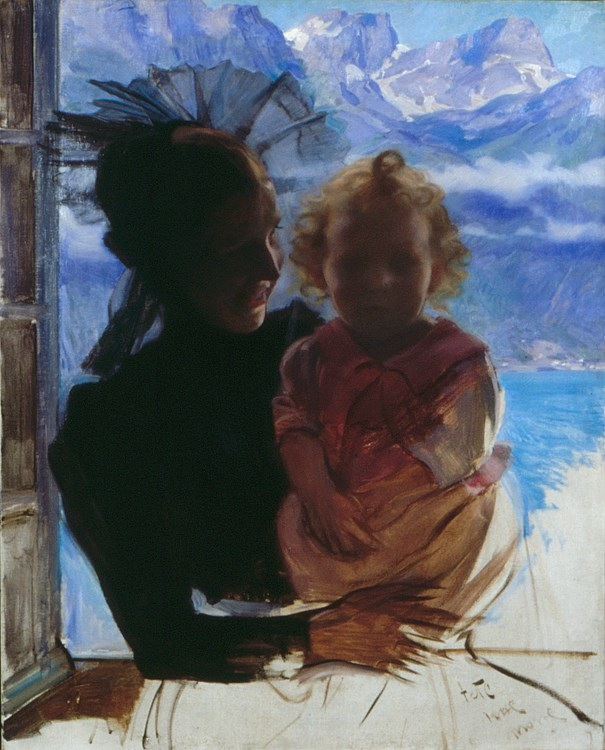
Against the Day

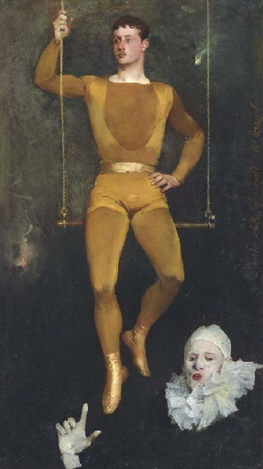
The Trapeze Artist and the Clown

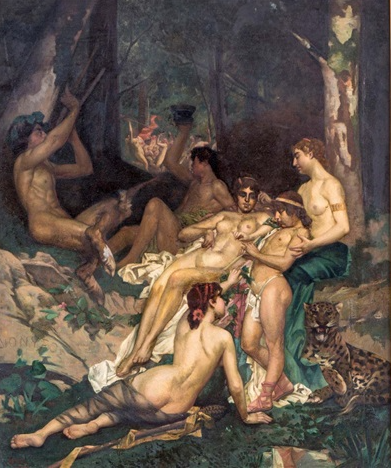
Bacchanal
