= Jeronimus Spengler =

Swiss glass painter

Jeronimus Spengler (c. 1589–1635) was a Swiss glass painter.
