= René Gilsi =

Swiss painter (1905–2002)

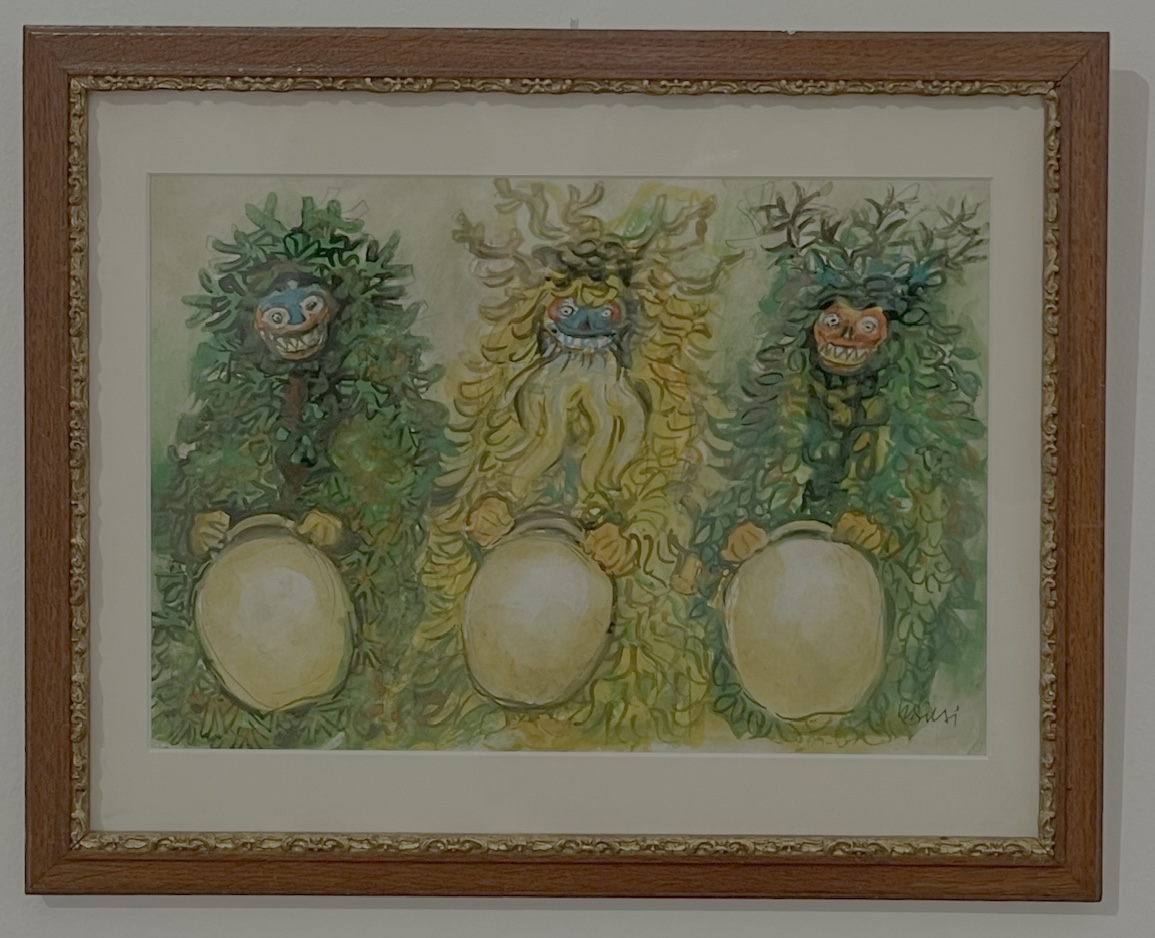
René GILSI (1905-2002), Silvesterchlause, 1980

René Gilsi (May 31, 1905 – 20 January 2002 St. Gallen) was a Swiss painter, graphic artist and caricaturist.

== Life and work ==
René Gilsi the son of painter and etcher Fritz Gilsi (1878-1961). He spent his school years in St. Gallen where he showed a strong disinclination towards mathematics ans languages. He was much more interested in drawing and after graduation did an apprenticeship in decorative painting. At 20 years old he spent a year in Paris. Afterwards he became the political caricaturist of the Swiss satirical newspaper Nebelspalter.

Gilsi spent extended periods of time in Vienna, and worked a graphic artist and caricaturist in Zurich and St. Gallen. He soon started to add text and verses to his drawing. This led to publishing of his books Onkel Ferdinand und die Pädegogik (Uncle Ferdinand and Pedagogy) in 1950, as well as Manchmal stimmsts (Sometimes it's right) in 1964. In his last years he turned to painting and created numerous works.

== Selected writings ==
- René Gilsi: Onkel Ferdinand und die Pädagogik. Schweizer Spiegel Verlag, Zürich 1950.
- René Gilsi: Manchmal stimmts. 40 teilweise noch aktuelle Zeichnungen und Verse von René Gilsi. Verlag Oprecht, Zürich 1964.

== Literature ==
- Jürg Spahr: Gilsi, René. In: Historisches Lexikon der Schweiz.
- Isabella und Daniel Studer-Geisser, Hermann Bauer: René Gilsi. Zeichner und Maler. Ehren-Föbus der Stadt St. Gallen in Zusammenarbeit mit dem Kantonalen Amt für Kulturpflege, St. Gallen 1989.
- Der Karikaturist und Maler René Gilsi wurde 90. In: St. Galler Jahrbuch, Band 1996, S. 73–79 (archiviert in E-Periodica der ETH Zürich)
- Werner Weisskönig: Fritz und René Gilsi. In: Thurgauer Jahrbuch, Bd. 26, 1951, S. 19–23 (archiviert in E-Periodica der ETH Zürich)
