= Walter Enholtz =

Swiss painter

Walter Enholtz (1875–1961) was a Swiss painter. He was best known for his water colors, still lives, and self-portraits. One of the favorite sites for his paintings was located in the canton of Tessin.
