= Alexandre Perrier =

Swiss painter (1862–1936)

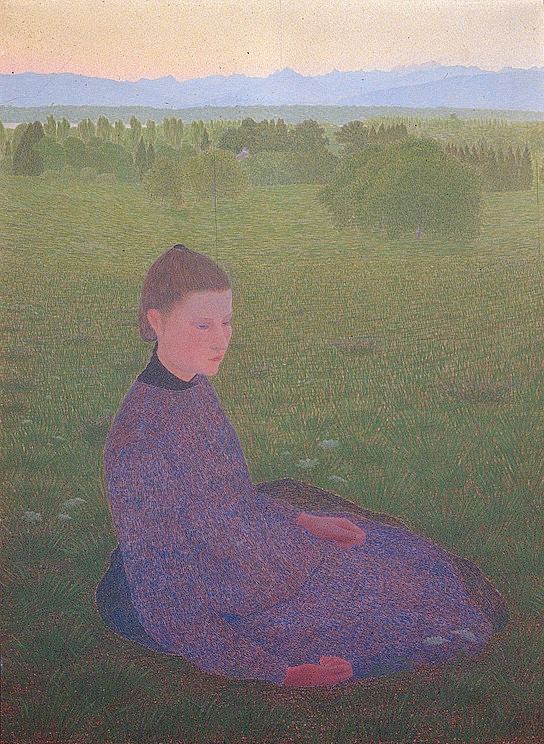
Dawn

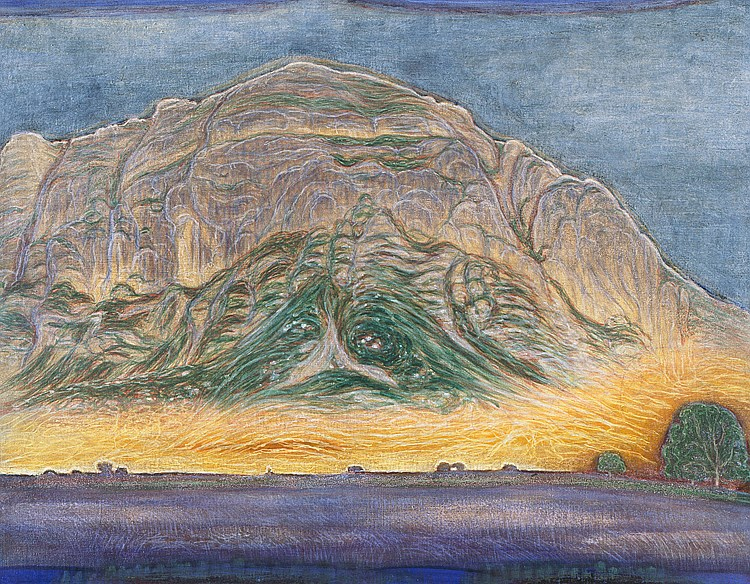
Salève

Alexandre Perrier (17 May 1862, Geneva - 5 May 1936, Geneva) was a Swiss landscape painter; mostly of Alpine mountain scenes. He also created a few portraits.

== Biography ==
He came from a family of craftsmen and lost his father at the age of six. After graduating from the Collège de Genève, he spent a short time working as a bank clerk, then moved to Mulhouse and trained as a textile printing designer.

In 1891, he went to Paris, where he worked as a fashion illustrator and associated with a circle of Swiss creative artists, including Eugène Grasset and Édouard Rod. He was also exposed to the latest styles in painting, such as Neoimpressionism, Symbolism and Art Nouveau and began painting himself, during summers spent in Geneva and Haute-Savoie. He also held several showings at the Salon des Indépendants.

He exhibited at the Exposition Universelle (1900), winning a bronze medal, then returned to Geneva, where he received a federal scholarship. He would remain there for the rest of his life. In 1902, he exhibited with the Vienna Secession. In 1917, he was elected President of the Geneva section of the Gesellschaft Schweizerischer Maler und Bildhauer.

His early paintings use a Pointillistic technique, but his later ones show a broader brushstroke. He did not follow the general practice of painting en plein aire, preferring to make sketches on site and producing the canvases in his studio. Many of his works are somewhat Chinese in character.

He died in an accident after leaving a showing of Modern Times by Charlie Chaplin. Major retrospectives were held in 1937 at the Musée Rath and the Kunsthalle Bern.
