= Jean Willi =

Swiss painter and author (born 1945)

Jean Willi (born October 14, 1945) is a Swiss painter, draftsman and author.

== Early career ==
Jean Willi completed a six-year training course as a graphic designer in Basel and worked there and in Paris, among other places. As a designer for Olivetti and Kodak. In 1973 he started painting and drawing after a trip to Africa. In 1977 he developed his own drawing technique in which a kind of calligraphy was combined to form structures and networks. Related works were exhibited in a group exhibition in Zürich in 1982 under the title Schreibgestik ('writing gestures') together with artists such as Roman Opałka and Cy Twombly.

== Success in the eighties ==
He attempted to paint letters based on an assumption of how they could sound like. In 1988 the Swiss art magazine Du published his illustrations for One Hundred Years of Solitude He showed the diversity of his artistic possibilities in the Basel exhibition Pole in 1989 when he tried to combine the various facets of his work and at the same time play them off against each other. Willi designed and illustrated a number of books, published texts in magazines and co-wrote scripts with Martin Suter for the Swiss television series Die Direktorin (The Director).
