= Anne Marie Trechslin =

Swiss painter, wood engraver, draftsperson and illustrator

- Born: July 17, 1927; Milan, Italy
- Died: August 28, 2007 (aged 80); Bern, Switzerland
- Occupation: Artist

Anne Marie Trechslin (17 July 1927 – 28 June 2007) was a Swiss painter, wood engraver, draftsperson and illustrator.

== Life ==
Trechslin studied painting in Paris and at the Kunstgewerbeschule in Bern. Afterwards she attended painting courses in Italy and England. She gained international recognition with her watercolors of birds and flowers. Trechslin's watercolor paintings are realistic rendition of plants and their harmonic depiction. She is known mainly for her expert illustrations of art and botanical books on flowers, especially roses, camellias and orchids.

In 1983 Trechslin illustrated a bibliophile edition of the first volume of a series on masdevallia orchidaceae, the text being written by taxonomist Dr. Carlyle August Luer, co-founder of the Marie Selby Botanical Gardens in Sarasota, Florida, and senior curator at the Missouri Botanical Garden in St. Louis The next volumes of the series were published by the American Orchid Society with illustrations by Stig Dalström of Florida. She also illustrated several books on roses written by Stelvio Coggiatti, of the scientific commission of the Enciclopedia Agraria Italiana and vice president of the Associazione Italiana della Rosa.

Trechslin had personal exhibitions of the works in Basel, Bern, Klosters, Paris, Rome, Florence, Perugia and on Malta. She also presented to Queen Fabiola of Belgium her watercolor painting of the “Pascali rose”, a Belgian cultivar which had received several international prizes. Thereafter, she presented her painting of the “Queen Elizabeth Rose” to the British Queen Mother.

In 2000, at the request of abbot Philippe Chèvre of Zürich she illustrated a bible in the manner of illuminated manuscripts.

In 1963, during the International Congress of Roses, the mayor of Nashville, Tennessee, offered Trechslin the key to the city. In 1987 she received the Paul Haupt Prize for book illustrations.

Series of postal stamps based on Trechslin's watercolor paintings of flowers, fruits and birds were issued by San Marino and by Switzerland. For the "Year of the Rose 2002", the Pro Juventute Foundation issued a series of semi-postal stamps including Trechslin's paintings of the “Christmas Rose” and the rose cultivars "Ingrid Bergman", "Charmian", "Belle Vaudoise" und "Frühlingsgold". Rubbing the stamps with the finger makes them exude a rose scent, while the Christmas Rose stamp exudes a scent of fir, cinnamon and carnation. Trechslin was awarded the "Cavallino d'Oro Prize" in Venice for her postage stamps.

Trechslin also worked for the Carnegie Museum of Natural History of Pittsburgh Pennsylvania and for the Muséum national d'histoire naturelle in Paris. Rosarian Jean-Marie Meilland named a rose cultivar in her honor.

== Books illustrated by Trechslin ==
- Eric Bois: Rosen Bd. 1. Silva Verlag, Zürich 1961.
- Eric Bois: Zwiebel- und Knollenpflanzen, Wunderwelt der Gartenblumen Bd. I. Silva Verlag, Zürich 1964.
- André Leroy: Rosen Bd. 2. Die schönsten Rosen der Welt und ihre Kultur. Silva Verlag, Zürich 1967.
- Karlheinz Jacobi: Winterharte Blütenstauden Wunderwelt der Gartenblumen Bd. 2. Silva Verlag, Zürich 1970.
- Sträucher und Bäume Wunderwelt der Gartenblumen Bd. 3. Silva Verlag, Zürich 1972.
- Old garden roses. Editions Le Moulin, 1975.
- Gérald Van der Kemp & Stelvio Coggiatti: Blumen Und Vogel: Die Malerin Anne Marie Trechslin. Amriswiler Bucherei, Zürich 1979.
- Carlyle A. Luer: Thesaurus Masdevalliarum: a monograph of the Genus Masdevallia, Part 1. Verlag Helga Koniger, Zürich 1983.
- Stelvio Coggiatti: Alte Rosen - neue Rosen. Silva Verlag, Zürich 1985.
- Stelvio Coggiatti: The Language of Roses. Gallery Books, New York 1986.
- Stelvio Coggiatti: Berühmte Rosen und ihre Geschichte. Amber Grünwald Verlag, 1987, ISBN 978-3-922954-06-4.
