= Hedwig Scherrer =

Swiss painter (1878–1940)

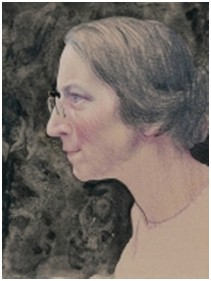
Image of Hedwig Scherrer Selbstportrait

Hedwig Scherrer (11 March 1878 in Sulgen – 8 May 1940 in Zürich) was a Swiss painter, illustrator, and caricaturist, best remembered for her graphic art for the Wandervogel, and her miniature, Art Nouveau, and expressionist style paintings. One of the first academically trained female artists in Switzerland, studying under Emil Nolde, her works have been exhibited at the Kunstmuseum St. Gallen and various public installations in St. Gallen.
