= Ernest Hubert =

Swiss painter

Ernest Hubert (1899–1988) was a Swiss painter.
