= Johann Heinrich Troll =

Swiss painter

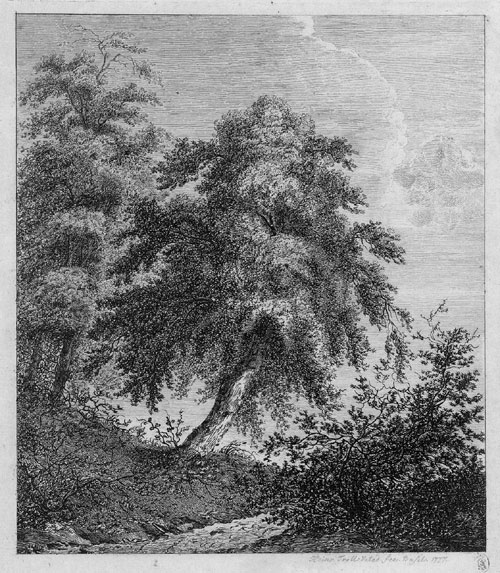
One of many artworks performed Johann Heinrich Troll

Johann Heinrich Troll (born 1 July 1756 in Winterthur; died there 9 May 1824) was a Swiss painter, graphic artist and engraver.

Troll studied with Christian von Mechel in Basel and for seven years with Adrian Zingg in Dresden. He then traveled extensively through Europe (Italy, Holland, France) and finally settled back in his hometown of Winterthur.

In addition to watercolors and etchings of plants, he mainly created landscape paintings and copper engravings, for example, the Viamala or the Tuileries in Paris.
