= Emanuel Witz =

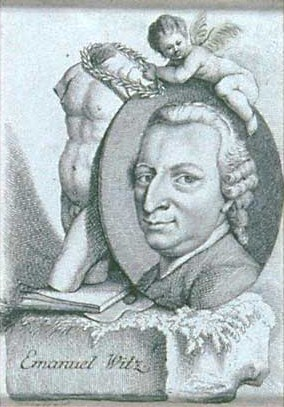
Johann Heinrich Lips, Portrait of Emanuel Witz, ca. 1790

Emanuel Witz (27 June 1717 – 11 December 1797) was a Swiss painter, born in Biel.

Witz was inspired by his brother (a sculptor) to apply himself to drawing. He subsequently received drawing lessons from Johann Rudolf Huber in Bern. In 1738, he moved to Paris where he continued his education under instructions of the painter Louis Galloche. He made friends with Edmé Bouchardon, François Boucher, Pierre-Jacques Cazes, Charles Joseph Natoire and Charles André van Loo. Afterwards he worked in Spain and Portugal as a portrait painter, historical painter and genre painter. Soon after his arrival, he got into difficulties and returned to Biel in the 1760s.
