= Franz K. Opitz =

Swiss painter

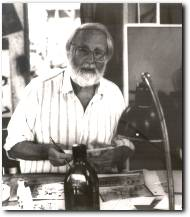
A picture of Franz K. Opitz doing his painting activities

Franz K. Opitz (1916–1998) was a Swiss painter.
