= Stefan Haenni =

Swiss painter and a crime novel writer (born 1958)

Stefan Haenni (born 4 August 1958 in Thun) is a Swiss painter and a crime novel writer.

== Biography ==
Stefan Haenni visited the Schule für Gestaltung in Bern and studied at the University of Bern and the Université de Fribourg history of art and psychology. With his painting Haenni reached in the 1980 first appreciations. He realized among other things works with the portraits from the Nobelprice winner Nagib Machfus and the surrealistic Swiss painter Meret Oppenheim. The leading subject of modern oriental painting reached Haenni after a trip along the Nile in 1990. Many works were created after that like West-östlicher Divan from Goethe, the series of Monde Arabe and Lawrence of Arabia – new paintings about an old film. "Haenni's paintings live from affection for the world of the Orient without denying their anchoring in Western culture and are such important messengers of international understanding as no other Swiss artist has to show in this perseverance and at the same time lightheartedness." His works are collected in several Swiss Museums of Modern Art, Swiss Banks (BEKB, Credit Suisse, UBS) and private Art-Collections.

Since 2009 Stefan Haenni has also written five crime novels about the Thun private detective Hanspeter Feller (Gmeiner Verlag). The first three novels Narrentod, Brahmsrösi and Scherbenhaufen form the Thun Crime Trilogy, in which the court jester Charles the Bold as Fulehung, Johannes Brahms with the Thun Sonata or Heinrich von Kleist with the broken jug were at the center of the plot. The crime novel Tellspielopfer is about a robbery murder in the area of the Tellspiele Interlaken. Berner Bärendreck tells the story of a Bernese patrician who gets into trouble because of a painting by Ferdinand Hodler. Todlerone in 2021 is a collection of 24 shortstories playing in the Bernese Oberland. With the anthology Zürihegel in 2022, he expanded the murderous radius into the Zurich Oberland.

In the contemporary crime novel Eiffel's Guilt (2023), Haenni depicts Switzerland's largest railway accident, caused in 1891 by the collapse of the railway bridge near Münchenstein constructed by Gustave Eiffel, and he tells the story of a survivor who, through the tragic events, came across the trail of a devious crime.

Stefan Haenni lives in Thun/Switzerland.

== Exhibitions (selection) ==
- 1979, 1985: Weihnachtsausstellung, Kunstmuseum Thun
- 1984: Stefan Haenni, Galerie Wendeltreppe, Schloss Schadau, Thun/Switzerland
- 1985: Young artists, Volkswirtschaftskammer from the Berner Oberland, Interlaken
- 1988: Milkproject, Intermilch, Ostermundigen
- 1988: Vernissage without works, Galerie am Kreis, Bern
- 1989: People and Portraits, Swiss Institute Contemporary Art New York
- 1990: Projekt Querschnitt, Kinomuseum Moskau
- 1991: Projekt Querschnitt, Freiraum Helmkestrasse, Hannover
- 1991: Querschnitt – the Printedition, Weisser Saal, Museum of modern art, Bern/Switzerland
- 1992: Querschnitt ist tot - es lebe der Querschnitt, Kunstmuseum Thun
- 1995: Mannsbilder – Frauenzimmer (Sylvie Fleury, Urs Stooss, David Hockney, Stefan Haenni), Galerie Martin Krebs, Bern
- 1997: New pictures from Aegypt, Galerie Martin Krebs, Bern
- 1997: From the beginning of art, museum of modern art Olten/Switzerland
- 1999: Konnex Kairo, Stefan Haenni, Not Vital a.o., Museum of modern art Thun/Switzerland
- 1999: The promised Rosegarden, Galerie Martin Krebs, Bern
- 2006: From the Niesen to the pyramids, Galerie Martin Krebs, Bern
- 2008: Orient and Okzident, Villa Schüpbach, Art Collection Steffisburg
- 2009: Durch die Blume (Flower view), Samuel Buri, Stefan Haenni, Shirina Shabhazi, Galerie Martin Krebs, Bern
- 2013: A bed of roses, Stefan Haenni, Ottmar Hörl, David Hockney, Galerie Martin Krebs, Bern
- 2013: Dazzling, New pictures and tondos, Galerie Martin Krebs, Bern
- 2015: United Colors, Jim Avignon, Stefan Haenni, Teruko Yokoi, a.o., Galerie Martin Krebs, Bern
- 2018: Printemps oriental, Galerie Hodler, Thun

== Crime novels ==
- Narrentod. Fellers erster Fall. Gmeiner, Messkirch 2009, ISBN 978-3-89977-799-4.
- Brahmsrösi. Fellers zweiter Fall. Gmeiner, Messkirch 2010, ISBN 978-3-8392-1036-9.
- Scherbenhaufen. Fellers dritter Fall. Gmeiner, Messkirch 2011, ISBN 978-3-8392-1193-9.
- Berner Bärendreck. Fellers vierter Fall. Gmeiner, Messkirch 2019, ISBN 978-3-8392-2484-7.
- Tellspielopfer. Fellers fünfter Fall. Gmeiner, Messkirch 2020, ISBN 978-3-8392-2594-3.
- Todlerone. Winterkrimis. Gmeiner, Messkirch 2020, ISBN 978-3-8392-2763-3.
- Zürihegel. Winterkrimis. Gmeiner, Messkirch, 2022, ISBN 978-3-8392-0319-4.
- Eiffels Schuld - Das grösste Eisenbahnunglück der Schweiz. Gmeiner, Messkirch 2023, ISBN 978-3-8392-0477-1.

== Bibliography ==
- Schweizerisches Institut für Kunstwissenschaft (Hrsg.): Künstlerverzeichnis der Schweiz 1980–1990. Huber, Frauenfeld 1991.
- Schweizerisches Institut für Kunstwissenschaft (Hrsg.): Biographisches Lexikon der Schweizer Kunst. Verlag Neue Zürcher Zeitung, Zürich 1998, Band 1.
- Steffan Biffiger: Stefan Haenni: Orient und Okzident – Mit Werkverzeichnis Malerei 1978 bis 2008. ArchivArte, Bern 2008, ISBN 978-3-9522302-5-1.
- Christoph Geiser: Stefan Haenni: Der Aegyptenzyklus. Galerie Martin Krebs, Bern 1998.
- Andreas Langenbacher: Dromedar und Ketzerkönig. In: Stefan Haenni: Kunstmuseum Thun, 24. September bis 1. November 1992. Museum of Modern Art Thun, Thun 1992.
- Hans Christoph von Tavel: Stefan Haenni: Barocklahoma. Ausstellungskatalog, Galerie Martin Krebs, Bern 1994.
- Franziska Streun: Thun – Ein Lesebuch, Zytglogge Verlag, Bern 2014, p. 100/101. ISBN 978-3-7296-0884-9
- Paul Ott: Mord im Alpenglühen, Der Schweizer Kriminalroman - Geschichte und Gegenwart, Chronos Verlag, Zürich 2020, p. 223/224. ISBN 978-3-0340-1584-4
