= Georg Friedrich Heilmann =

Swiss artist (1785–1862)

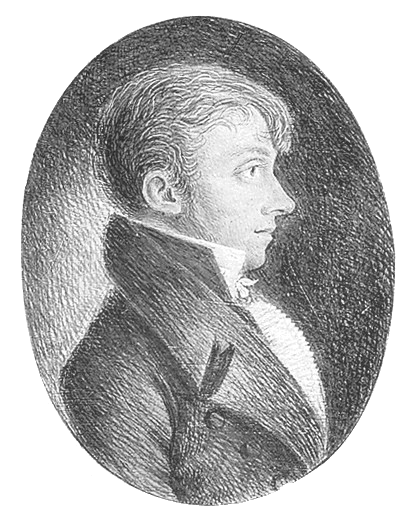
Georg Friedrich Heilmann

Georg Friedrich Heilmann (1785–1862) was a Swiss military figure, politician and landscape painter.

== Biography ==
Together with his tutor Johann Rudolf Wyss Heilmann undertook several trips abroad and studied at the Universities of Halle and Heidelberg, law, science and literature, and was a member of the Corps Guestphalia Halle, Corps Rhenania Heidelberg and Corps Guestphalia Heidelberg. After his return to Switzerland, he also devoted agronomic studies at the von Fellenberg's Institute in Hofwil.

From a young age he felt drawn to the military. He was a lieutenant and captain of the French National Guard, from 10 September 1806 until 1 May 1816.

During the liberation war from 1813 to 1815 he was the official ambassador of his home town in the headquarters of the allies, in Zurich and at the Vienna Congress. He was then Governor of the State Parliament in the cantonal parliament, and finally a colonel in the cantonal military service. From 1831 to 1844 he was the fourth captain in the Naples Swiss government. On 27 September 1845 he retired from active military service. In his spare time he was an accomplished landscape painter.
