= Carlo Borer =

Swiss artist and designer

Carlo Borer (born March 23, 1961, in Solothurn) is a Swiss artist and designer.

== Works ==
Carlo Borer is deliberately autodidact as an artist. He has been working freelance since 1981, beginning with figurative paintings, drawings, and three-dimensional works made of polyester and electrical light. Since 1991, he has been building objects out of stainless steel or aluminum. And in 1999, he started using 3D computer graphics to design, develop, and construct sculptures, installations, furniture and utilitarian objects, such as espresso machines, ventilators, and mailboxes. A laser is used to cut the forms out of the sheet metal, which are then rounded off and welded. Borer refers to works that have come about like this as Transformers, Loops, and Clouds. Though Borer takes his inspirations for his No Readymades and his Spaceships from pieces he has found, nevertheless, he creates the works as complex forms in virtual reality by means of CAD systems that have been further developed especially for this.

Carlo Borer lives in Wanzwil, and maintains his studio in Zuchwil.

== Selected exhibitions ==
- 1990 : Kunstmuseum Solothurn, Solothurn
- 1997 : BHG Gallery, Los Angeles – Sinking Cities
- 2004 : Stadt Solothurn - The Big Loop
- 2009 : 4.th Swiss Triennial Festival of Sculpture, Bad RagARTz in Bad Ragaz and Vaduz
- 2010 : art station, Zurich – 2structures
- 2010 : Stiftung SkulptUrschweiz, Ennetbürgen-Luzern
- 2010 : BeGe Galerien, Ulm
- 2010 : Nord Art in Büdelsdorf
- 2011 : Nord Art in Büdelsdorf
- 2011 : Kulturforum Würth Chur, Chur – Thinking Shape

== Commissions visible in public ==
- 2002 : Object No. 333, Saint-Blaise NE,
- 2007 : Object No. 397, Ennetbüren-Luzern
- 2009 : Object No. 401, Hilti Foundation, Schaan
- 2011 : Object No. 370, Kulturforum Würth Chur

== Selected literature ==
- Catalogue Werkjahrbeiträge des Kantons Solothurn (1989) - Kantonales Kuratorium für Kulturförderung, Solothurn
- KVS Cultura, Ittigen, Issue 1 (1991)
- Peculiar Geometries, (Sculpture Vol. 27 No. 10, 2008): article by Peter Lodermeyer
- Kunst Vol. 4 (2011)
