= Johann Robert Schürch =

Swiss painter (1895–1941)

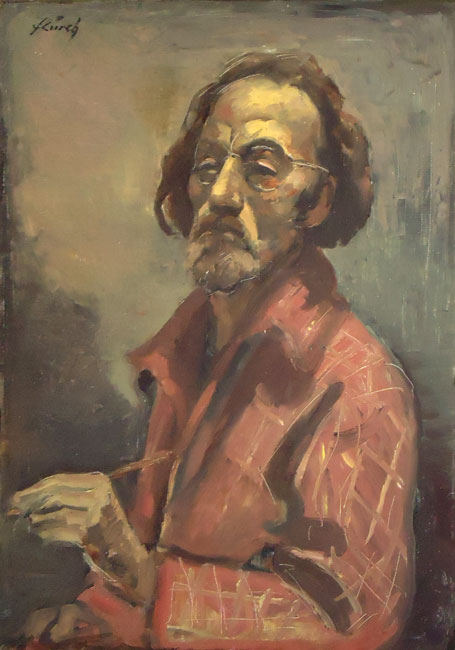
Self-portrait

Robert Schürch (18 November 1895, Aarau – 14 May 1941, Ascona) was a Swiss Expressionist painter and graphic artist, whose work is mostly grotesque or satirical; consisting largely of drawings. As a young man, he took Johann (or Johannes) as his first name to honor his father.

== Biography ==
His father, Johann, operated a printing plant and his mother, Anna, was a teacher. In 1907, his father died, followed shortly by both of his sisters, who died of tuberculosis. His mother took him to Zürich, where he received training as a poster artist and took drawing lessons from the landscape painter, Ernst Otto Leuenberger in nearby Zollikon. In 1914, he was drafted into the reserves.

In 1916, his mother sent some of his drawings to Ferdinand Hodler, who advised them to come to Geneva, which they did. After work at the École des Beaux-Arts, he studied with Eugène Gilliard (1861–1921) at his private school, then took a position in Hodler's studio as his assistant. When Hodler died in 1918, Schürch painted him on his deathbed.

In 1921, he received a stipendium from a charitable fund overseen by the Zürcher Kunstgesellschaft (Artists' association) that enabled him to study in Florence, where he became acquainted with Max Gubler and copied the Old Masters. By 1922, however, he had come to find life there too stressful and confusing, so he moved to Ticino and lived with his mother in a small chalet in Monti, near Locarno.

He became isolated there and earned little from his work, so his mother supported them by writing pieces for various periodicals. He was there until 1932, when he broke away from his mother; spending time at small cabins in Minusio and Brione and making friends in the artistic community. In 1933, he was in a serious automobile accident that left his health impaired. The following year, he settled in Ascona, with his partner, Erica Leutwyler and took part in the cultural activities at Monte Verità.

In 1939, his mother died and, the following year, he was drafted into the Grenzdienst (Border Patrol). While serving, he became seriously ill and was discharged. He died of advanced tuberculosis in 1941, at his home in Ascona.

The largest collection of his works may be seen at the Kunsthaus Zürich.

== Selected works ==
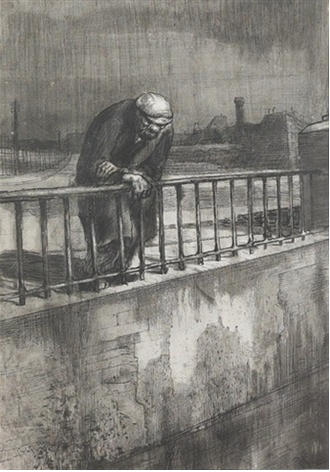
Loneliness

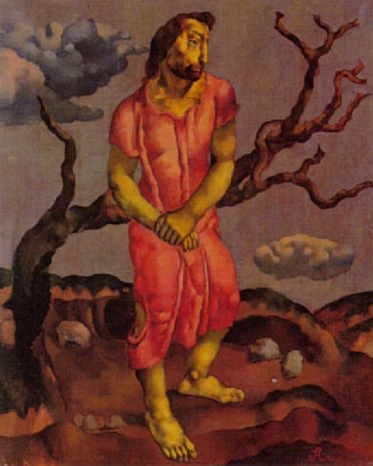
Zarathustra

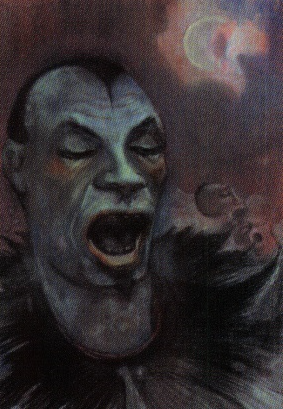
The Clown

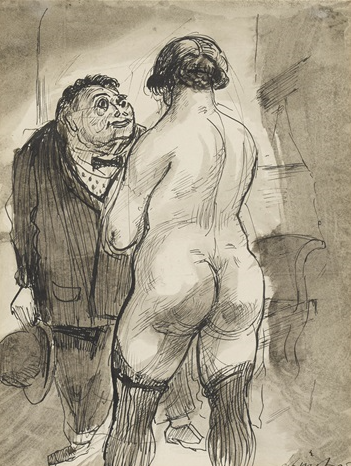
The Suitor

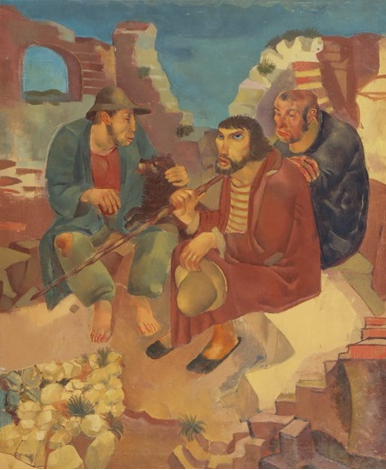
Shepherds

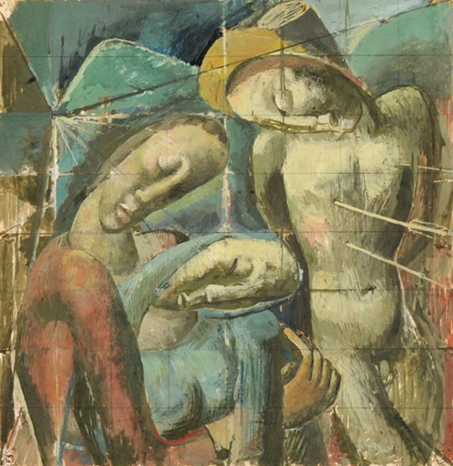
St. Sebastian with Mourners

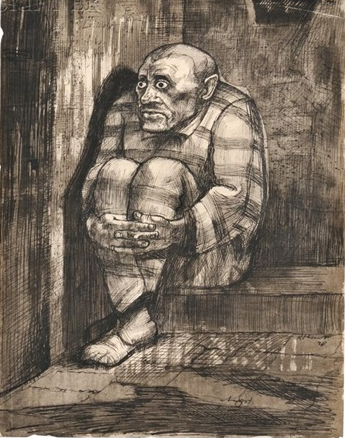
Angst

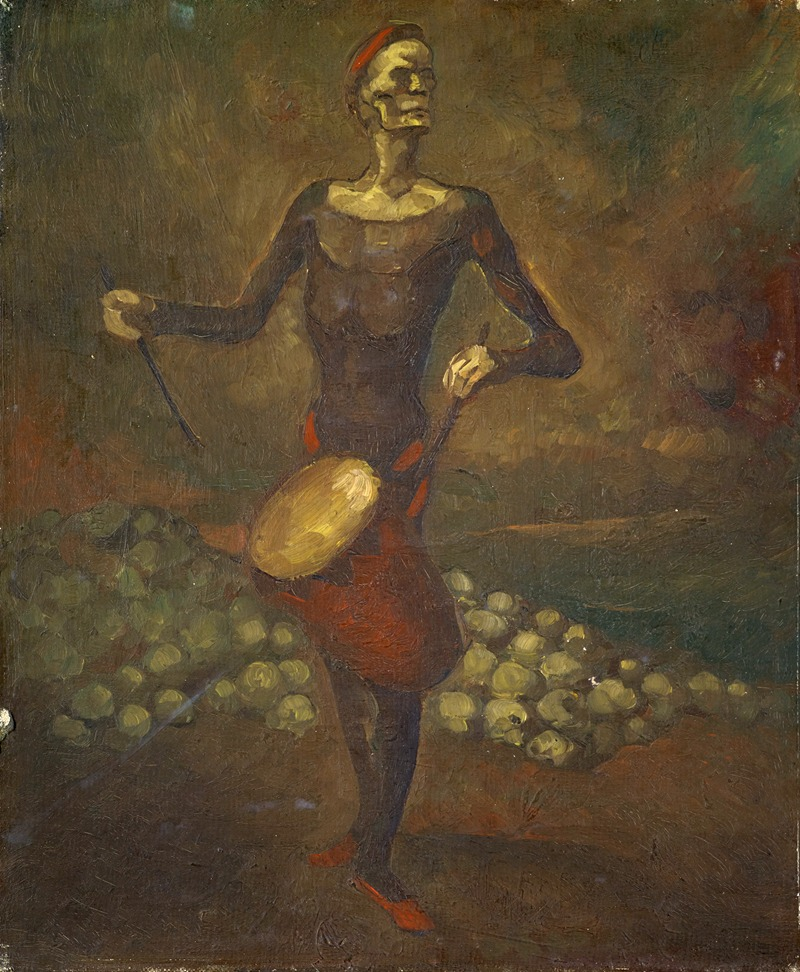
Macabre Drummer
