= Jakob Häne =

Swiss painter (1913–1978)

Jakob Häne (1913–1978) was a Swiss painter, particularly noted for his frescoes and murals, as well as of his paintings of the Mary, mother of Jesus. Häne trained at the art academy in Brussels and then worked as a freelance artist. He received his first commission from a church in Gähwil, a village in Kirchberg, St. Gallen.
