= Max Oertli =

Swiss painter

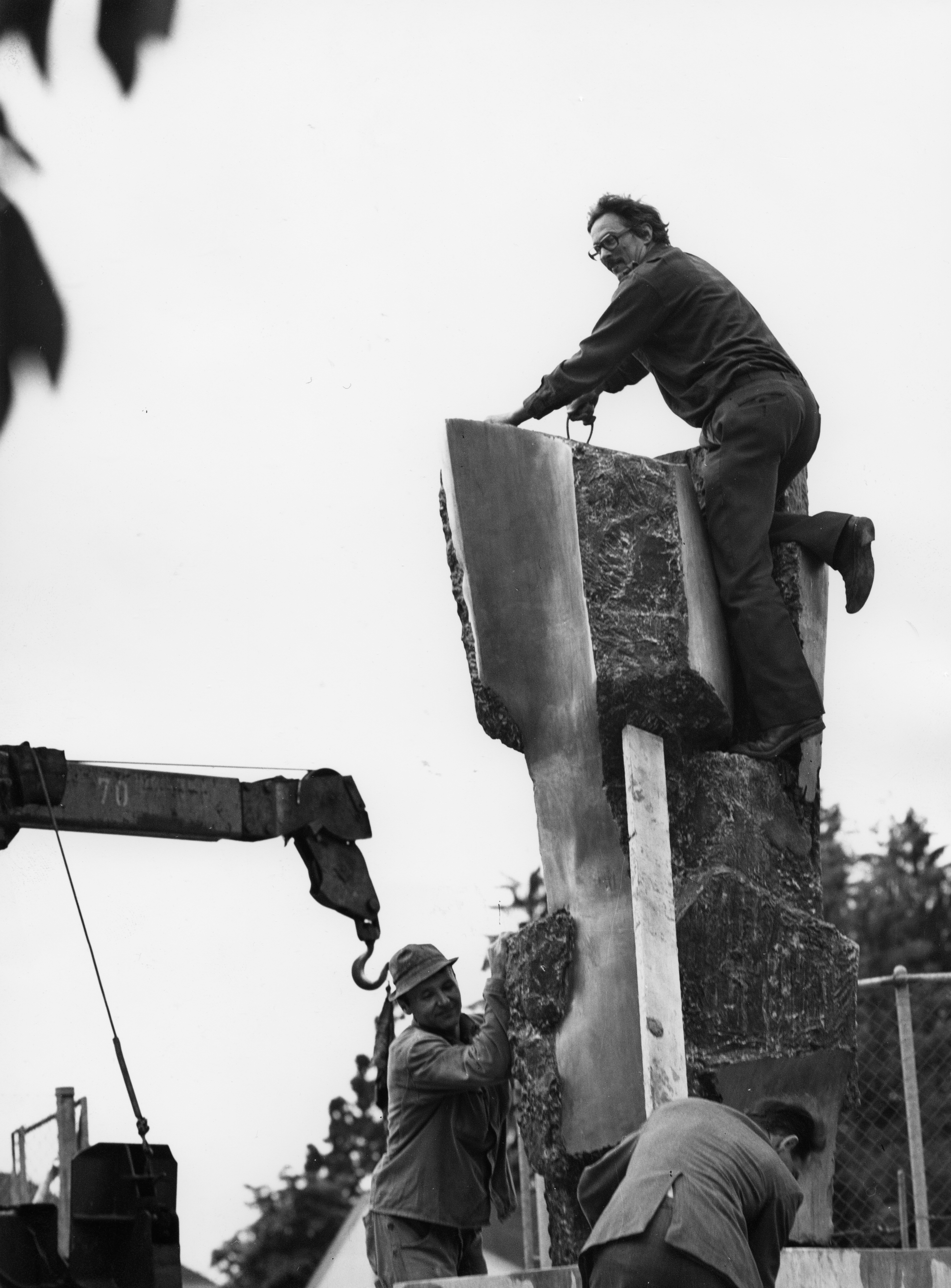
- Max Oertli during the installation of his bronze sculpture at a sports field in 1971
- Born: August 5, 1921; Sargans
- Died: December 8, 2007 (aged 86); St. Gallen

Max Oertli (1921–2007) was a Swiss painter.

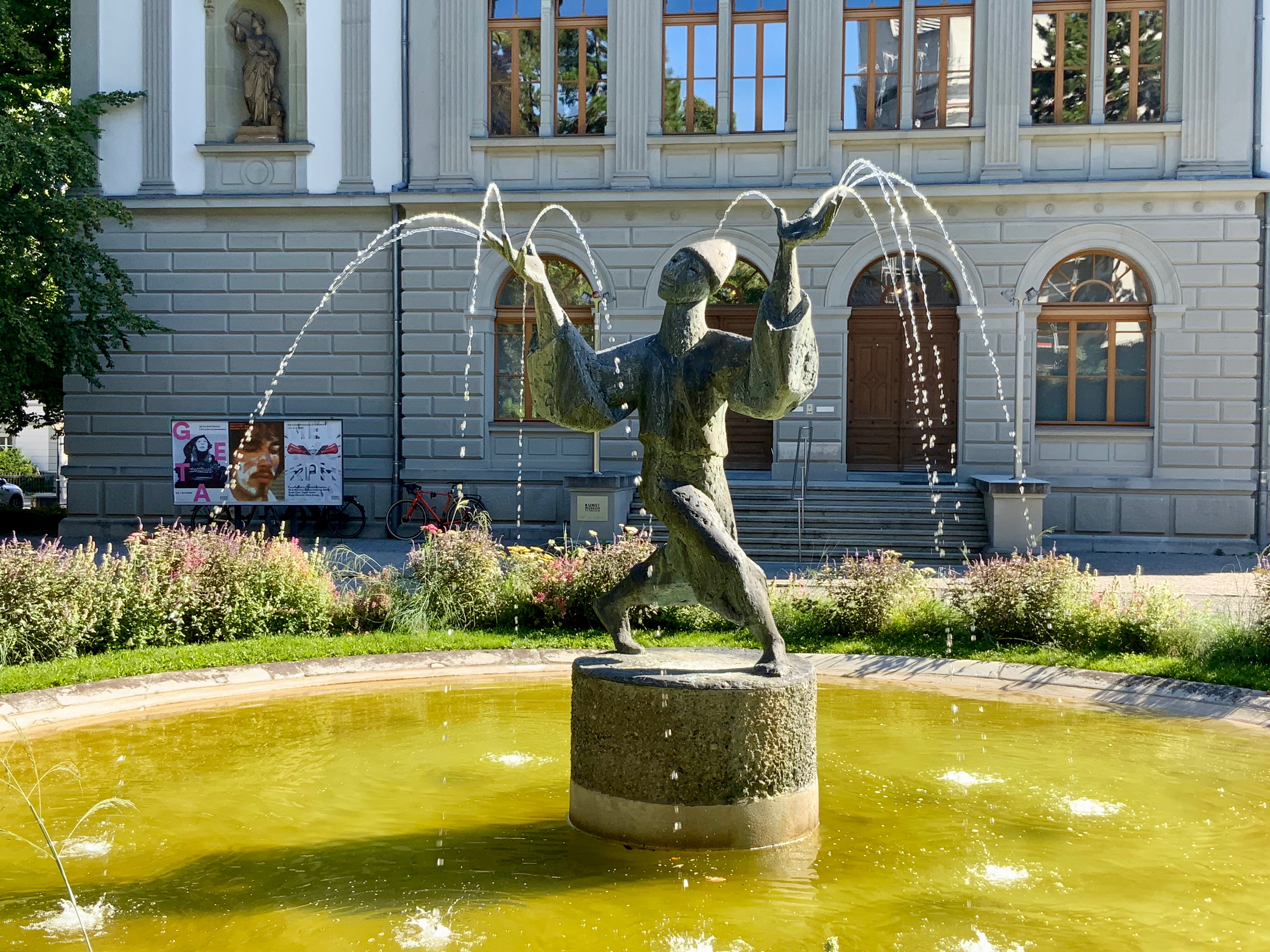
Juggler Fountain (Water fountain designed by Max Oertli in 1960)
