= Julius Voegtli =

Swiss painter (1879–1944)

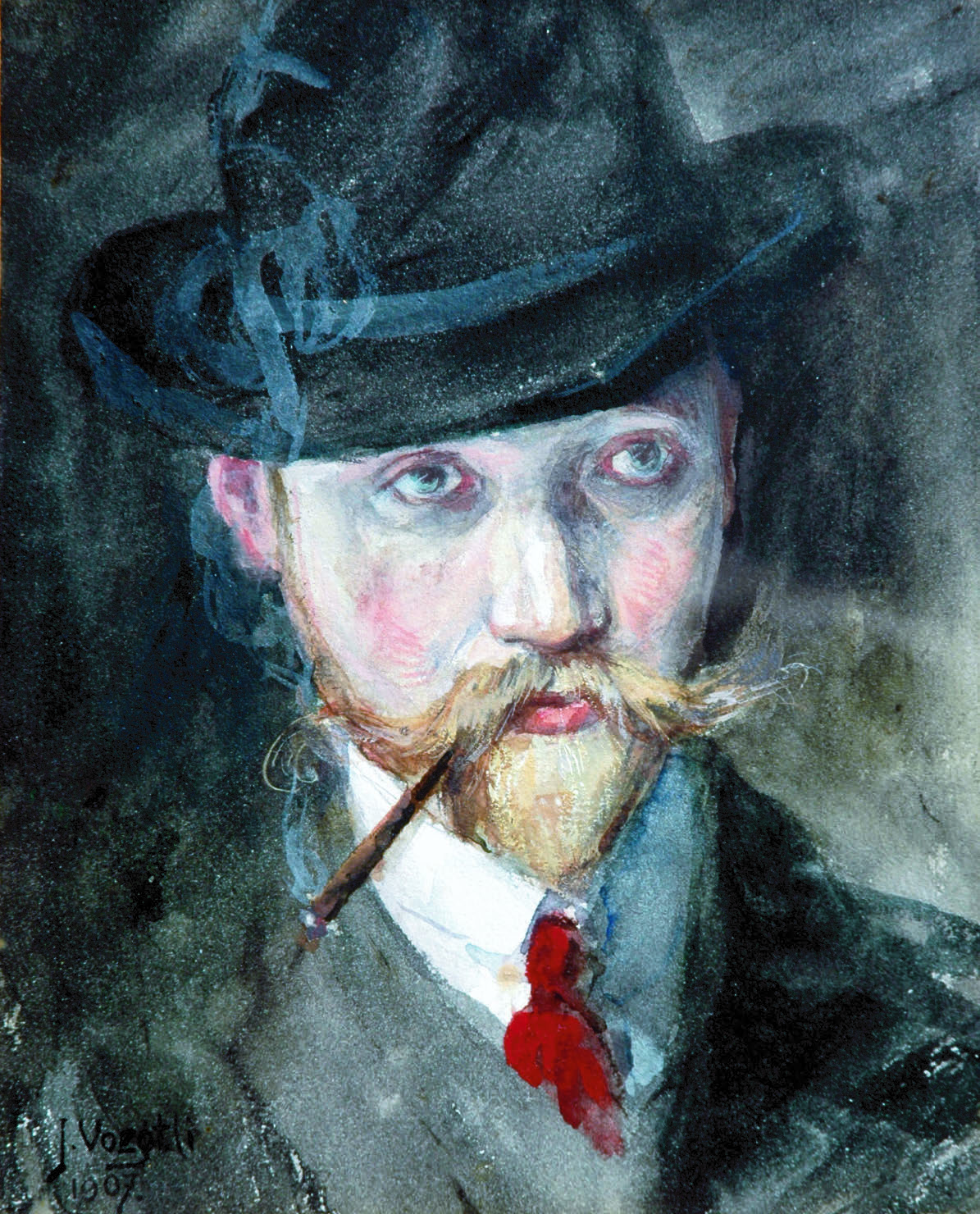
Self-portrait

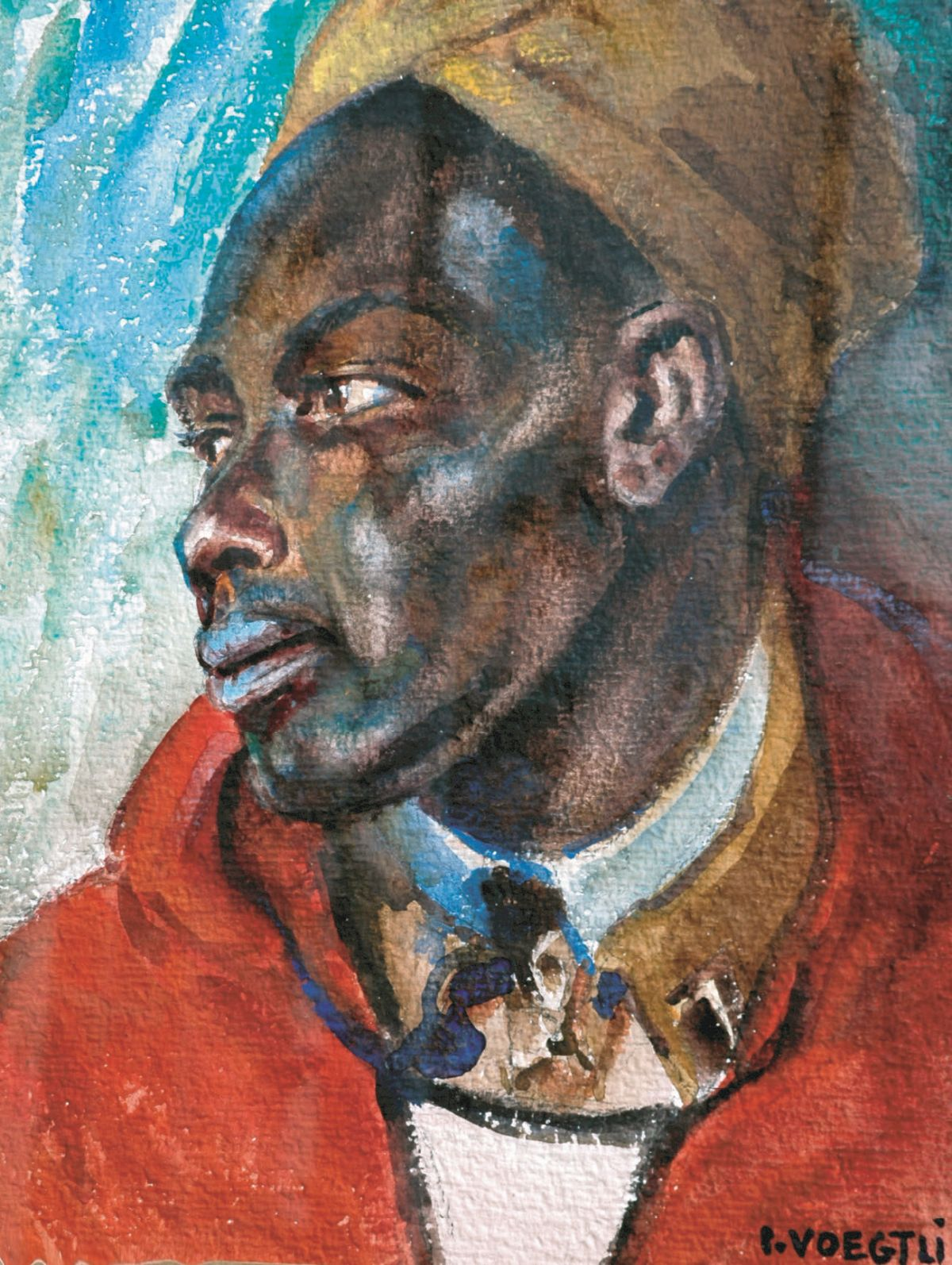
Portrait of a Spahi

Julius Voegtli (29 March 1879, Malters - 21 November 1944, Biel) was a Swiss Impressionist painter who was almost entirely unknown during his lifetime.

== Biography ==
He was the son of a country doctor and began painting and drawing as a teenager. The works that survive from this period indicate that he was originally a Realist. He studied decorative painting in secondary school, followed by lessons at the Gewerbeschule (vocational school) in Basel. He was then apprenticed to firms in Basel and Bern.

He studied at the Academy of Fine Arts, Munich under the landscape painter, Karl Raupp. From 1900 to 1928, he earned his living as a decorative painter and eventually became the co-owner of a painting company. Much of his work consisted of frescoes for public buildings and churches.

In the 1920s, he became involved in municipal politics in Biel. After 1928, he held several offices related to infrastructure and planning; notably with the Verkehrsbetriebe Biel (transport agency).

After graduating from the Academy, his work consisted largely of landscapes and still-lifes. Later, he became more focused on portraits, especially those of people from the rural population. In the 1940s, he did a series of portraits depicting Spahis (foreign legion soldiers), who had escaped from captivity in Germany and fled to Switzerland for refuge. They were among his last paintings, as he was seriously ill at the time.

During his lifetime, little attention was paid to his work, by professional artists or the public. No exhibitions were held. Most of his known paintings are in private collections, although some may be seen at the NMB Neues Museum Biel.

He was also an author and published numerous short stories. Many have strange subject matter and he was known for his public readings of them.

Records of his life and work are difficult to come by. Obituaries make only passing reference to his artistic work. In contrast, his few surviving personal letters place great emphasis on it.

During the winter of 2017/18, a collection of thirty-two paintings and numerous sketches were displayed at the Dounan Art Museum in Kunming, China.

== Sources ==
- Julius Voegtli website
- "Julius Voegtli". SIKART Lexicon on art in Switzerland.
- Entry in the Matrikelbuch of the Academy of Fine Arts, Munich, Vol.3
