= Max von Mühlenen =

Swiss painter (1903–1971)

- Born: Max Rudolf von Mühlenen; 10 February 1903; Bern, Switzerland
- Died: 20 October 1971 (aged 68); Bern, Switzerland
- Known for: Painting, drawing, glass painting, murals, sgraffiti

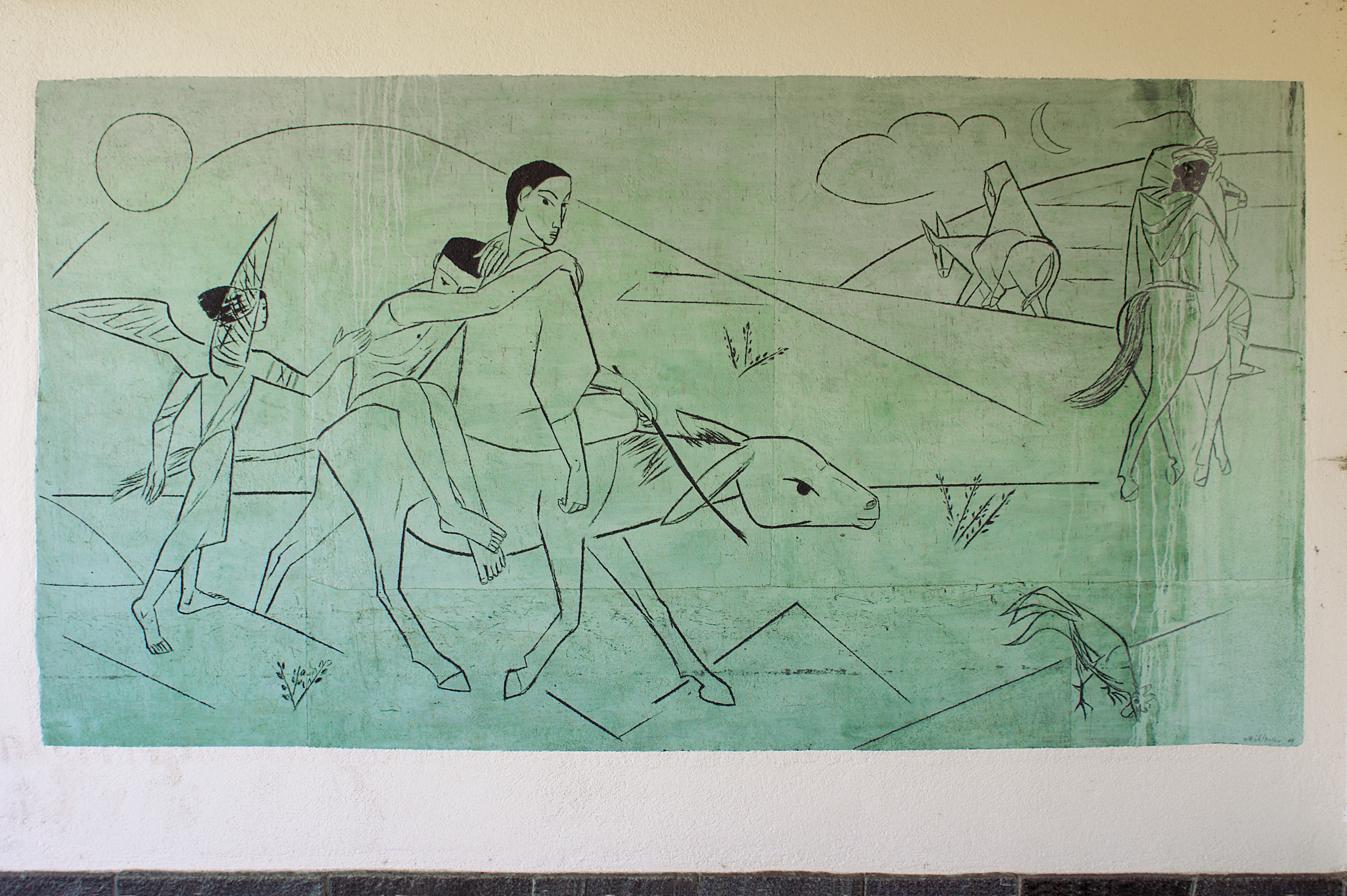
Der barmherzige Samariter, sgraffito by Max von Mühlenen, 1949

Max Rudolf von Mühlenen (10 February 1903 – 20 October 1971) was a Swiss painter, glass painter and educator. He co-founded the avant-garde artists’ group Der Schritt weiter in 1931 and later ran a painting school in Bern, where his students included Franz Gertsch. His work developed from landscape painting toward abstraction. He received the City of Bern Art Prize three times and exhibited at documenta II in Kassel.

== Biography ==
Max von Mühlenen was born on 10 February 1903 in Bern. He grew up in Bern and completed his Matura in 1922. From 1922 to 1923, he attended the Gewerbeschule Bern and the Kunstgewerbeschule Zürich. In 1924, he moved to Paris, where he studied at the Académie Julian and with André Lhote.

In southern France, von Mühlenen co-founded the avant-garde artists’ group Der Schritt weiter in 1931. By the late 1930s, he had returned to Switzerland and was living in Stuckishaus near Bern with Käthe Aeschbacher, whom he married in 1939. Through his friendship with Louis Moilliet, he became interested in stained glass. In 1940, he opened a private painting school in Bern. His students included Franz Gertsch, who attended von Mühlenen’s painting school from 1947 to 1950. The school was incorporated into the Kunstgewerbeschule Bern in 1964, where von Mühlenen taught until his death.

Von Mühlenen served on several art commissions, including the Swiss Federal Art Commission from 1957 to 1964. He died in Bern on 20 October 1971.

== Work ==
Von Mühlenen’s early work was centred on landscape painting. During the 1930s, he experimented with colour and moved toward abstract painting. In the same period, he reduced the role of representational motifs and developed more abstract compositions through colour and handling of paint. From the 1940s, he reversed conventional colour perspective, using red for open space and blue for denser figures. By the 1950s, his work had become increasingly monochrome as he explored pure colour.

In addition to paintings, von Mühlenen produced stained glass, murals and sgraffiti. His public works included the fresco cycle Theseus-Zyklus at the University of Bern and the sgraffito Der barmherzige Samariter at Tiefenau Hospital in Bern.

== Exhibitions and awards ==
Von Mühlenen received the City of Bern Art Prize in 1942, 1947 and 1948. His work was shown at the Kunsthalle Bern in 1960. In 1974, the Kunsthalle Bern presented Max von Mühlenen. 1903-1971. Retrospektive des malerischen Werkes. In 1977, the Kunstsammlung der Stadt Thun presented Hommage à Max von Mühlenen at the Thunerhof. His work was also shown in the group exhibition 11 Berner Künstler at the Kunsthaus Zürich in 1940 and at documenta II in Kassel in 1959.
