= Andreas Henzen =

Swiss painter

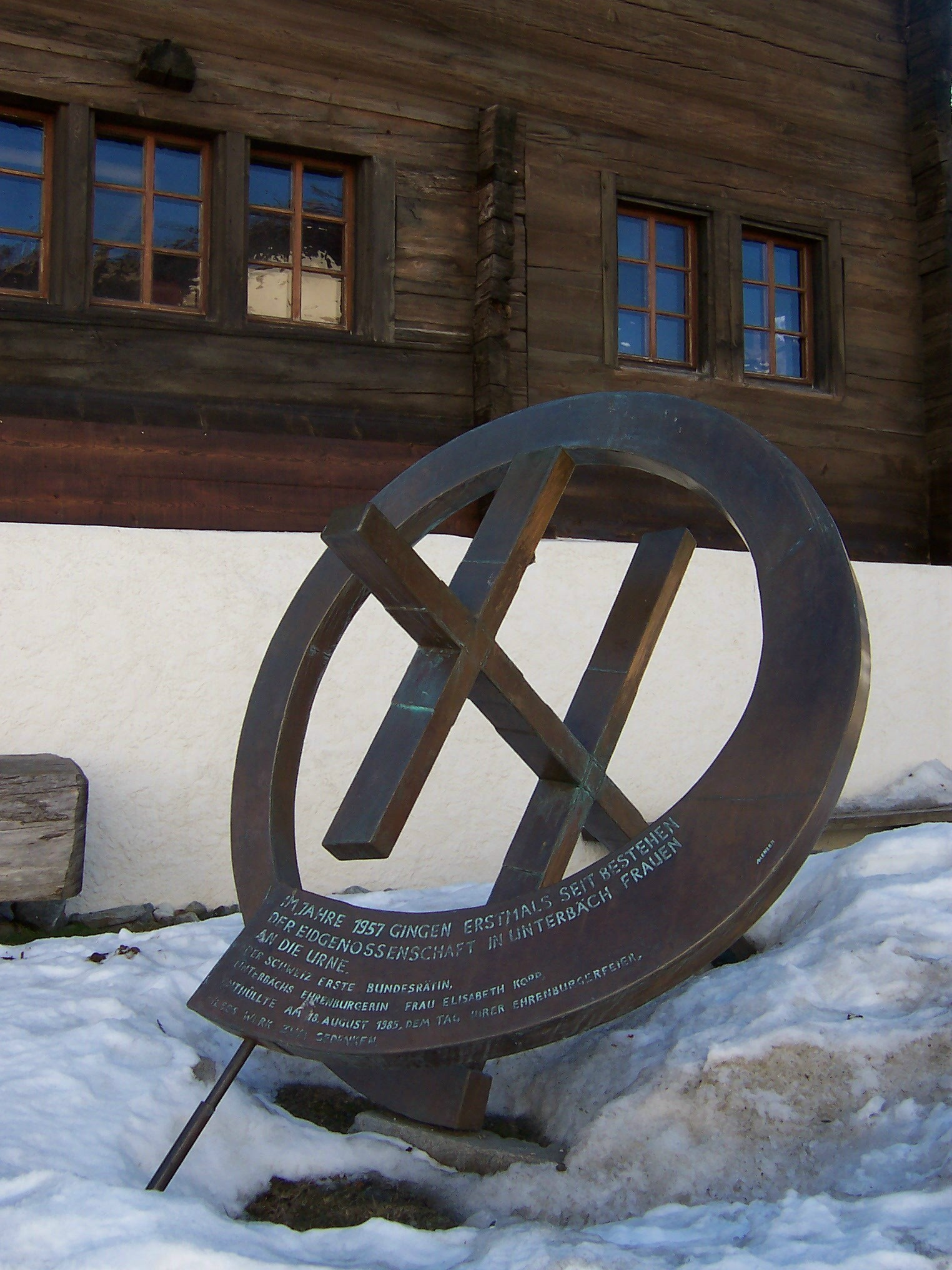
Andreas Henzen: Woman-Memorial of Unterbäch, 1985

Andreas Henzen (born 1 January 1955) is a Swiss painter and president of the Swiss Association of Painters, Sculptors and Architects (GSMBA, founded 1865).
