= Otto Frölicher =

Swiss painter

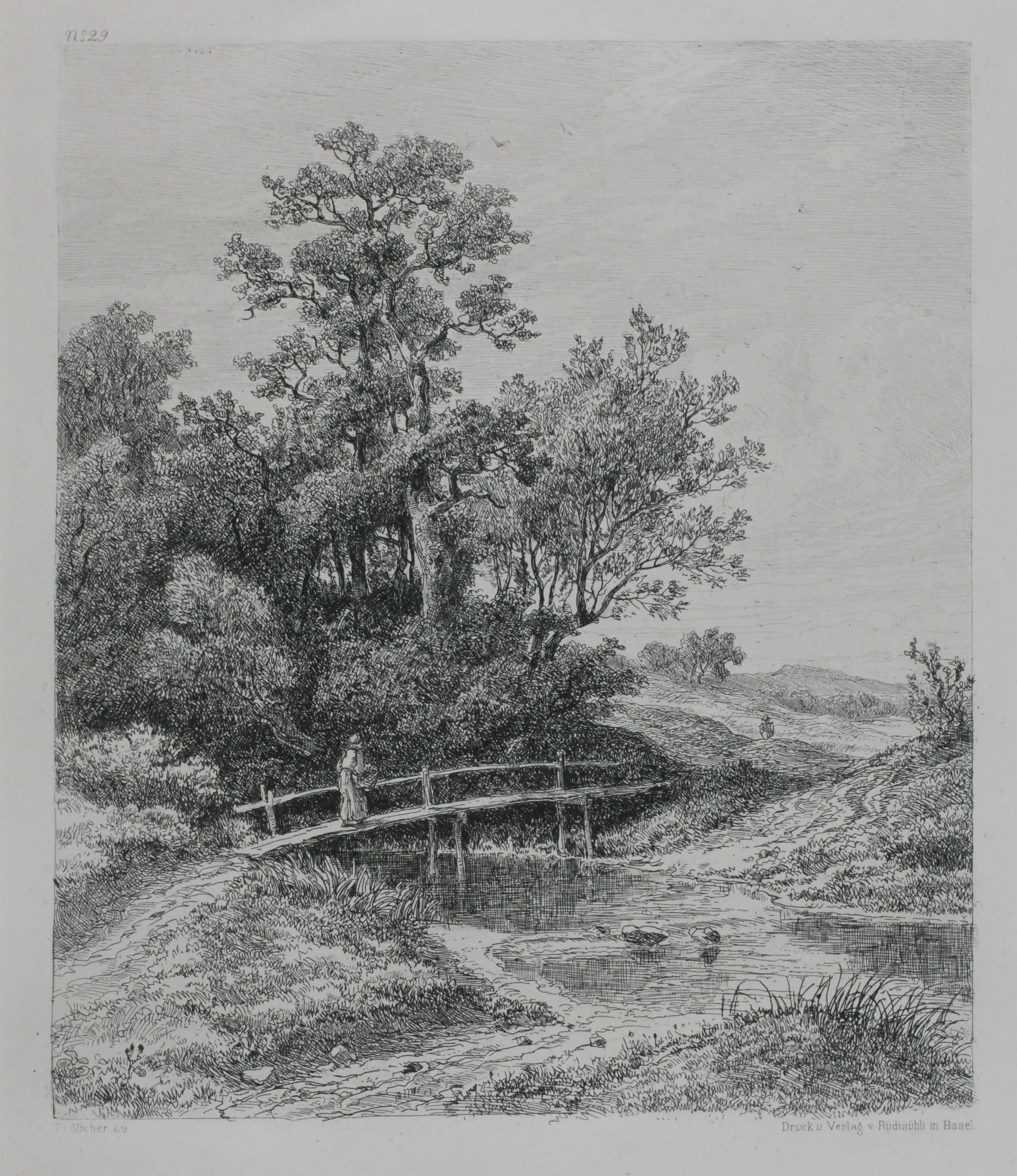
Path in the Countryside

Otto Viktor Frölicher (5 June 1840 – 2 November 1890) was a Swiss landscape painter.

== Life ==
He was born in Solothurn, where his father worked for the local government. In 1859, he enrolled at the Academy of Fine Arts Munich, and became a student of landscape painting under Johann Gottfried Steffan. Four years later, he moved to Düsseldorf, where he came under the influence of Oswald Achenbach. After going home to Solothurn, he found that he was unable to earn a living as a painter there and returned to Munich and discovered a new influence, Adolf Heinrich Lier. In 1876, he travelled to Paris on the recommendation of Lier, but was not able to adapt to big city life and, a year later, returned to Munich which, at that time, had barely 200,000 people.

He was a member of several major artists' associations and served as a judge for exhibitions at the Glaspalast. Also, he was chairman of an organization devoted to the interests of Swiss artists residing in Munich.

At the age of thirty-nine, he suffered a bout with diphtheria, which left him in permanent ill-health. Later, he was diagnosed with cancer. Contemporary sources, however, give his cause of death as a "groin disease" (contracted while painting in the wild?) that led to jaundice. He died in 1890 in Munich.

== Selected paintings ==
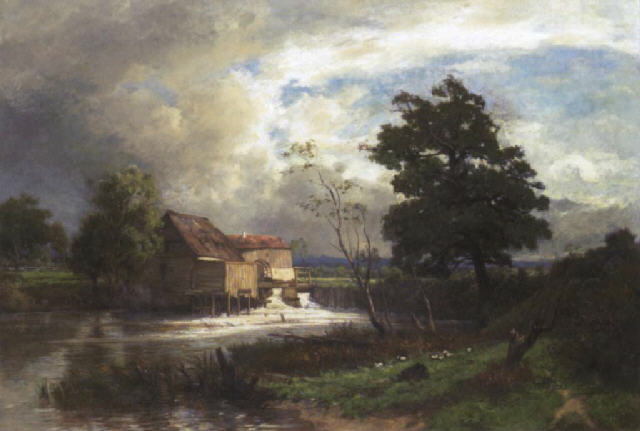
Mill on a Stream

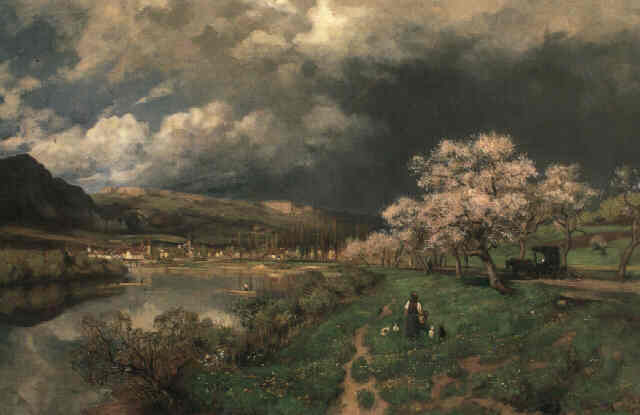
View of Solothurn

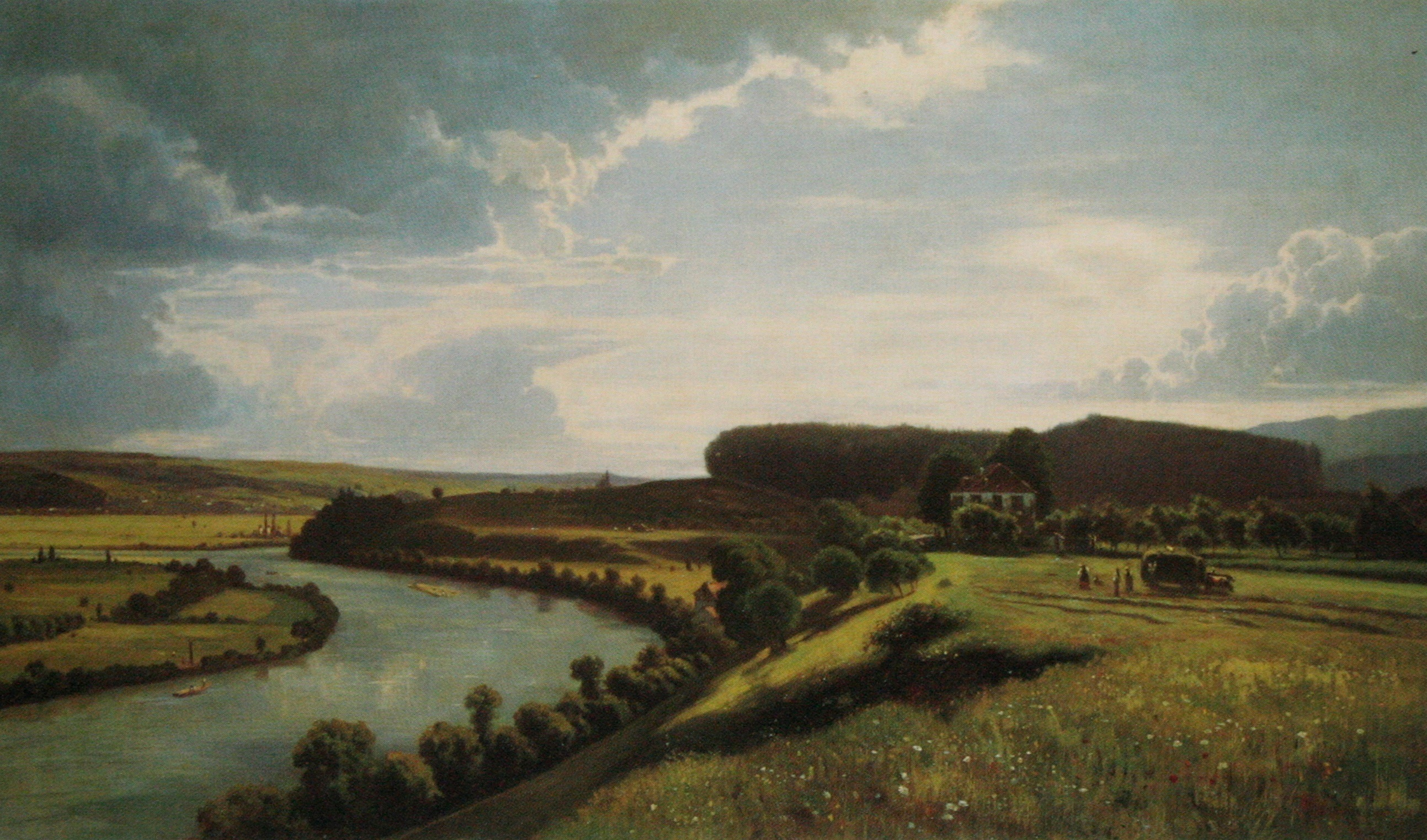
Hübeli (Bowil), near Attisholz
