= Caroline Sophie Sordet-Boissonnas =

Swiss artist (1859–1943)

Caroline Sophie Sordet-Boissonnas (1859, Geneva - 1943) was a Swiss painter. She received honorable mention at the Salon of Lyon, 1897. She was a member of the Exposition Permanente Amis des Beaux-Arts, Geneva. She was a pupil of the School of Fine Arts, Geneva, under Professors F. Gillet and M. E. Ravel. She was principally a portrait painter. Considered a successful artist, her pictures are in Geneva, Lausanne, Vevey, Paris, Lyon, Marseille, Dresden, and Naples.
