= Gruppe 33 =

Artists Collective in Switzerland

Gruppe 33 (English: Group 33) was an anti-fascist collective of Swiss artists founded in Basel.

== History ==
“Group 33” was founded on the same day Nazis began burning books en masse, 10 May 1933 and is named after the year 1933. It was formed by 15 artists out of a shared political ideology in conjunction with a growing resistance to Nazi influence in the border town of Basel. The members also opposed the dominance of older conservative artists who controlled the Society of Swiss Painters, Sculptors, and Architects (German: Gesellschaft Schweizerischer Maler, Bildhauer und Architekten, or GSMBA).

The collective was mostly made up of artists and architects from many different disciplines, but also included poets, musicians, actors, and writers. Their work was varied in expression as well as medium, incorporating avant-garde, surrealism, constructivism, and New Objectivity.

Over the course of several decades, 38 artists came to be associated with Gruppe 33. It continued to serve as a network emerging expressions and artistic movements. The group was officially dissolved in 1970. In 1983, a retrospective of the group’s work was held at the Kunsthalle Basel.

== Founding members ==
- Otto Abt, painter
- Paul Artaria, architect
- Walter Bodmer, painter and sculptor
- Paul Camenisch, painter
- Theo Eble, painter
- Max Haufler, painter, actor, and director
- Charles Hindenlang, painter
- Daniel Hummel, painter and sculptor
- Carlo König, painter
- Rudolf Maeglin, painter
- Ernst Max Musfeld, painter
- Hans Schmidt, architect
- Otto Staiger, painter
- Max Sulzbachner, painter
- Louis Weber, painter
- Walter Kurt Wiemken, painter

== Further members ==
- Meret Oppenheim, artist
- Kurt Seligmann, painter
