= Theo Eble =

Swiss painter

- Born: 1 June 1899; Basel, Switzerland
- Died: May 2, 1974 (aged 74); Basel, Switzerland
- Other name: Théo Eblé
- Education: Academy of Fine Arts
- Movement: New Objectivity; Gruppe 33; Constructivism
- Spouses: Julia Ris (m. 1925, divorced) Helena Merkle (m. 1949)
- Children: 1

Theo Eble or Théo Eblé (1 June 1899 –2 May 1974) was a Swiss painter, graphic designer and drafter.

Elbe was educated at the Gewerbeschule Basel, a Kunstgewerbeschule in Basel, from 1915 –1920 From 1922 –1925 Elbe studied at the Academy of Arts in Berlin, where he was a student of Karl Hofer. According to the Jean Tinguely, Eble also studied at Bauhaus.

In 1925 Eble married the Swiss painter Julia Ris,a fellow classmate at the Academy of Fine Arts, and moved with Ris to Basel. From 1931– 1967 Basel taught drawing and graphic design at Gewerbeschule Basel. Eble's students included Samuel Buri, Jean Tinguely, Beatrice Afflerbach and the graphic designer Rudi Meyer (1943-).

Eble was one of the founding members of Gruppe 33, an anti-fascist artist association in Basel.

== Personal life ==
In 1935 Eble's and Ris' daughter Doris Eva Eble, was born in Basel. In 1949 Elbe married Helena "Helli" Eble, née Merkle.

== Notes ==
1. The Gewerbeschule Basel is now the Schule für Gestaltung Basel (Basel School of Design) and the Allgemeine Gewerbeschule Basel (General Trade School Basel)
