= Charles Hindenlang =

Swiss painter and glass artist

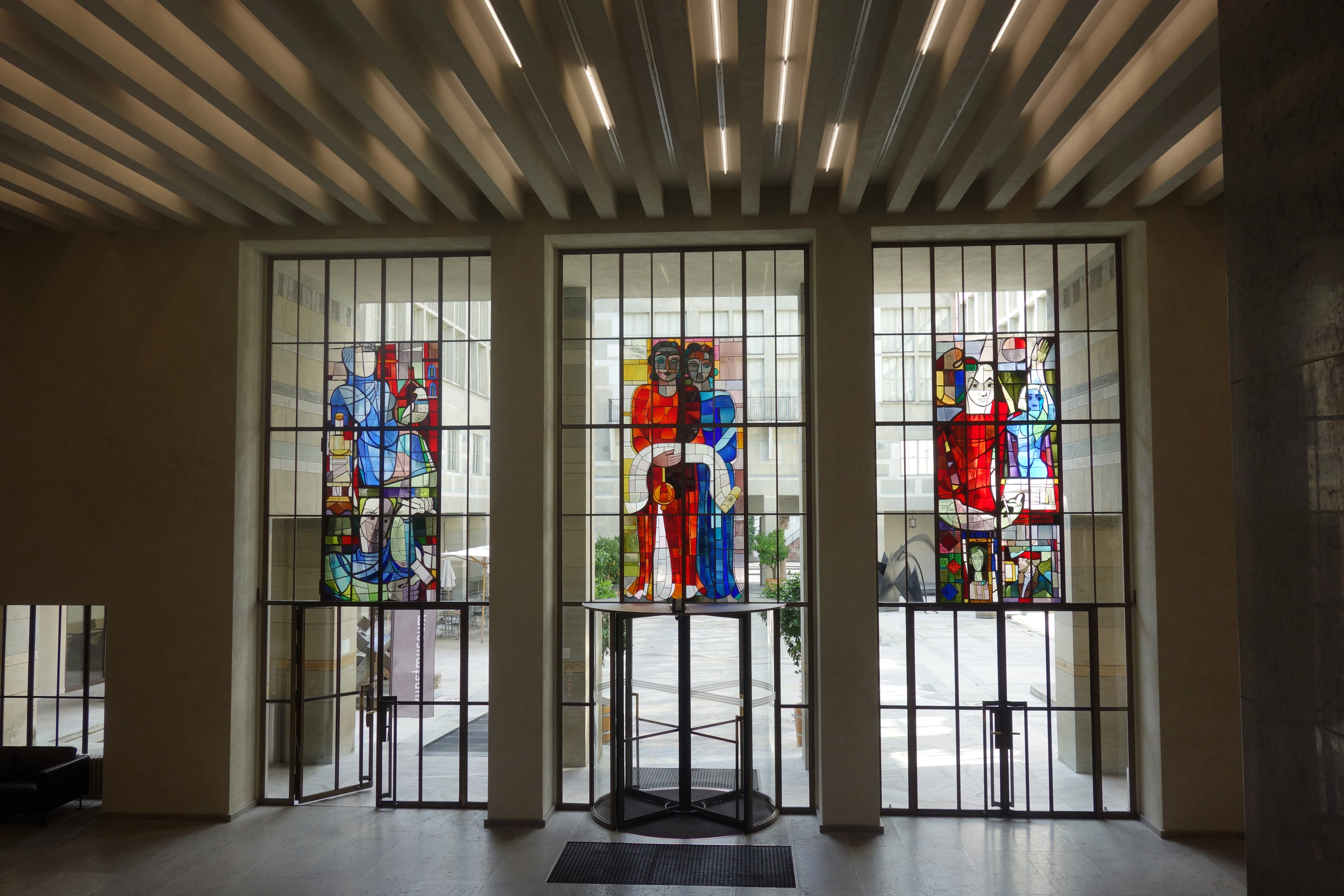
Entrance to Kunstmuseum Basel, with Otto Staiger

Charles Hindenlang (1 October 1894 – 30 April 1960) was a Swiss painter and glass artist. He was a member of Rot-Blau II and a co-founder of Gruppe 33. His work developed from early narrative paintings influenced by New Objectivity and Surrealism toward the boundaries of abstraction, and from the mid-1930s he worked increasingly in monumental painting and stained glass.

== Biography ==
Hindenlang was born in Basel on 1 October 1894. After leaving school he began an apprenticeship in the office of a Basel shipping company, but in 1911 switched to training as a decorative painter with Karl Schneider in Basel. From 1914 to 1916 he attended the Basel trade school, while continuing his artistic training autodidactically with Fritz Baumann, Paul Wilde and Jakob Mumenthaler.

In 1922 he travelled, including to Florence and Rome. Between 1932 and 1933 he spent periods in Paris, and he also travelled to Russia, Bulgaria, Romania, and Greece. From 1928 to 1933 he was a member of the artists' group Rot-Blau II, and in 1933 he became a co-founder of Gruppe 33. He subsequently worked mainly in Basel, where he died on 30 April 1960.

== Work ==
Hindenlang's early work included narrative paintings and works influenced by New Objectivity and Surrealism. He later moved toward the boundaries of abstraction. In the first half of the 1920s he also experimented with Expressionism influenced by Cubism.

In the 1930s he increasingly favoured motifs from the circus world, Basel Fasnacht, and the local Totentanz tradition. From the mid-1930s he devoted more attention to monumental painting and stained glass, and in the 1940s he designed stage sets for theatres in Basel and Bern.

In 1947 Hindenlang won the competition for five new choir windows for Basel Minster, although their execution was ultimately rejected in 1952. His public works included the stained-glass panel Wettstein und die Riehener (1939) for the Gemeindehaus in Riehen, the mural Wassersport (1937) for the Gottfried-Keller-Schulhaus in Basel, and the stained-glass works Symbole des realdenkenden Thomas and Symbole des gläubigen Thomas (1958) for Thomaskirche Basel.
