= Julia Ris =

Swiss artist (1904–1991)

- Born: Julia Ries; 21 September 1904; Kingston upon Hull, United Kingdom
- Died: December 16, 1991 (aged 87); Basel, Switzerland
- Other names: Julia Eble-Ris; Julia Eble-Ries; Julia Heid-Ris; Julia Heid-Ries
- Education: Academy of Fine Arts
- Spouses: Theo Eble (m. 1925, divorced) Fritz Heid (m. 1956)
- Children: 1

Julia Ris (21 September 1904, Kingston upon Hull – 16 December 1991, Basel) was a Swiss painter, sculptor, and graphic artist. She taught materials and drawing at the Gewerbeschule Basel, where she introduced students, including Jean Tinguely, to early 20th-century artistic movements such as Dada, Abstraction, and the Bauhaus.

== Early life and education ==
Julia Ries was born on the 21 September 1904, to a German Jewish family in Kingston upon Hull. Ris' father, Gustav Ries, was an importer and later owned a millinery factory, whilst Ris' mother, Agnes Ries née Siblerman, was a housewife and artist. Ris had four siblings, the youngest of which was the American metal artist Victor Ries (1907 – 2013). The family returned to Germany sometime between 1905–1907 and settled in Berlin.

== Education ==
From 1921–1925, Ris was educated at the Kunstgewerbeschule and the Academy of Fine Arts in Berlin. In 1925, Ris married Swiss artist Theo Eble, a fellow classmate at the Academy of Fine Arts. Ris and Eble and moved to Eble's hometown of Basel, where Ris began to develop her work toward abstraction and reliefs. In 1935 their daughter, Doris Eva Eble, was born.

According to Jean Tinguely, both Ris and Eble studied at Bauhaus.

== Career ==
From 1930–1957, Ris taught at the Gewerbeschule Basel applied arts department and sporadically created her own artworks. Ris' "material studies" class was based on the concepts of Bauhaus, and introduced students to the concept of creating collages using scrap and found materials such as metal, wood or cloth. Ris' students included Beatrice Afflerbach and Jean Tinguely. Ris is credited with introducing Tinguely to the work of Kurt Schwitters, Paul Klee, and to other artists interested in representations of movement (notably the Italian Futurists).

Ris was a member of the ″Allianz, Vereinigung moderner Schweizer Künstler″ (Alliance, Association of Modern Swiss Artists), and exhibited with the group in 1947. In 1956, Ris married the Swiss artist Fritz Heid (1916–2010) In 1967, Ris and Held were joint artists-in-residence at the Cité internationale des arts From 1970–1977 Ris taught at the Technical University of Basel, and lived in Sissach.

=== Filmography ===
- TINGUELY (2011) Directed by Thomas Thümena, Switzerland. As self (credited as Julia Eble-Ris)

=== Public artwork ===
- Julia Ris (1967) "Ohne Titel" ("Untitled"). Stained glass. University of Basel, Switzerland

=== Exhibitions ===
Date(s)	Title	Place	Type	Notes	Ref.
1942	″Julia Ris and Meret Oppenheim″	Galerie d'art moderne Marie-Suzanne Feigel, Basel, Switzerland	Group exhibition		
18 October – 23 November 1947	″Allianz. Vereinigung moderner Schweizer Künstler″	Kunsthaus Zürich, Zurich, Switzerland	Group exhibition		.
10 June – 15 July 1950	″Réalités Nouvelles. 5ème Salon″	Palais des beaux-arts, Paris, France	Group exhibition	Part of ″Salon des Réalités Nouvelles″	
2 December – 31 December 1950	″Weihnachtsausstellung 1950″	Kunsthalle Basel, Basel, Switzerland	Group exhibition		
9 May – 24 June 1951	″International Water Color Exhibition. Sixteenth Biennial″	The Brooklyn Museum, New York City, United States	Group exhibition		
8 September – 28 October 1951	″Malerei″	Kunsthalle Bern, Bern, Switzerland & Schulwarte Bern, Bern, Switzerland	Travelling group exhibition	Part of the ″Schweizerische Kunstausstellung Bern 1951″	
8 September – 28 October 1951	″Plastik, Wandteppiche″	Kunsthalle Bern, Bern, Switzerland & Schulwarte Bern, Bern, Switzerland	Travelling group exhibition	Part of the ″Schweizerische Kunstausstellung Bern 1951″	
8 September – 28 October 1951	″Zeichnung, Graphik″	Kunsthalle Bern, Bern, Switzerland & Schulwarte Bern, Bern, Switzerland	Travelling group exhibition	Part of the ″Schweizerische Kunstausstellung Bern 1951″	
14 March –14 April 1963		M. H. de Young Memorial Museum, San Francisco, United States	Group exhibition	Joint exhibition with Victor Ries	
24 October – 19 November 1964	"Julia Ris – Fritz Held"	Galerie Staffelei, Zurich, Switzerland	Group exhibition		
24 August – 29 September 1974	″Vier Basler Künstlern zum Geburtstag: Julia Ris, Albert Schilling, Max Sulzbachner, Alexander Zschokke″	Kunsthalle Basel, Basel, Switzerland	Group exhibition		
3 September – 30 September 1989	″4 Jahrzehnte Kunst in Baselland 1945-1989″	Schloss Ebenrain, Sissach, Switzerland	Group exhibition		
6 May – 30 June 2011	″Abstractions″	Woman Made Gallery, Chicago, United States	Group exhibition		

== See also ==
- Jean Tinguely
- Bauhaus

== Notes ==
1. Possibly the Kunstgewerbe- und Handwerkerschule (Berlin) or the Unterrichtsanstalt des Kunstgewerbemuseums Berlin.
