= Basel Minster =

Church

- Basel Minster, with Basel Münsterplatz in the foreground
- Basel Minster
- 47°33′24″N 7°35′32″E
- Country: Switzerland
- Denomination: Swiss Reformed
- Previous denomination: Roman Catholic

Architecture
- Style: Gothic

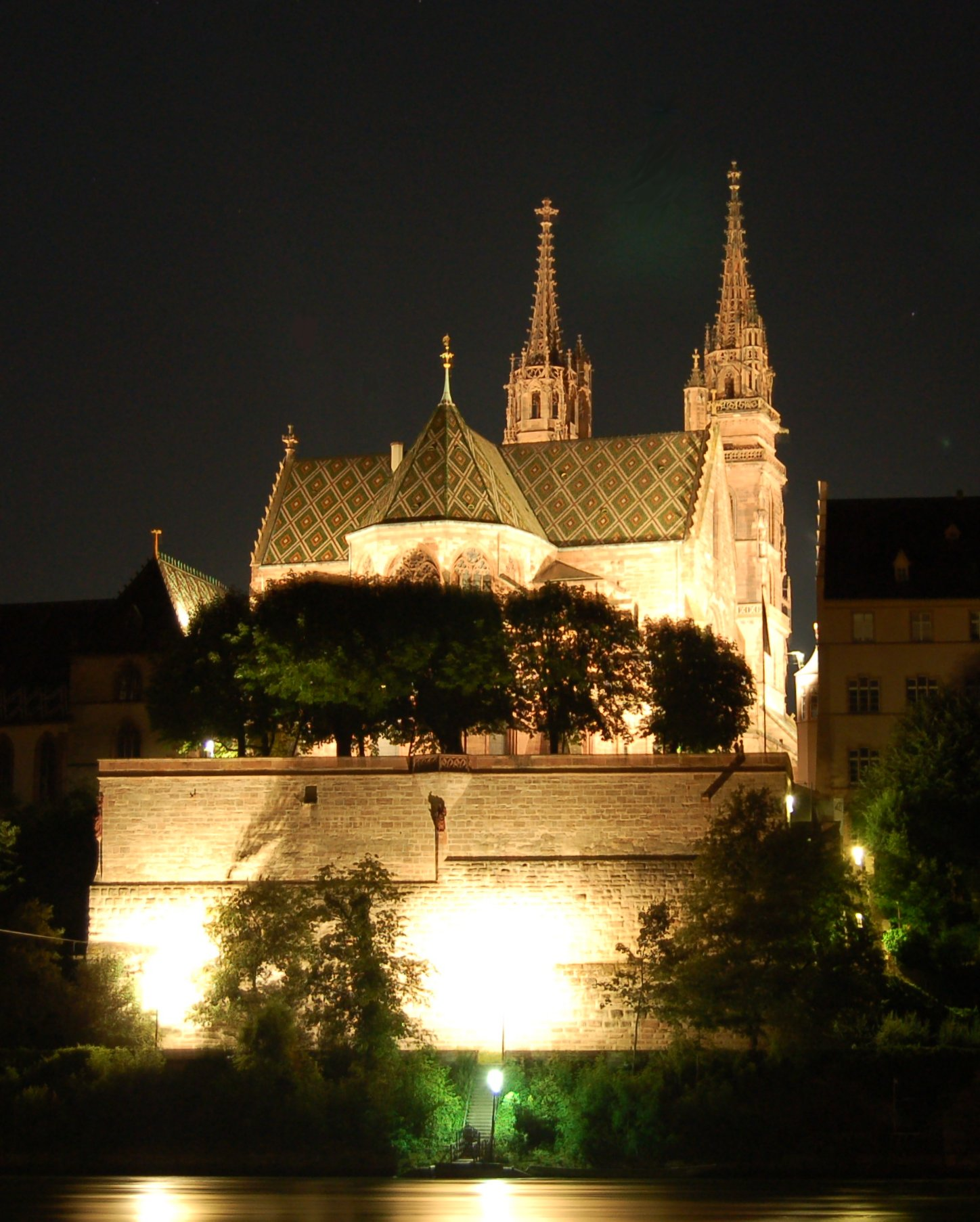
Basel Minster, viewed across the River Rhine by night

Basel Minster (German: Basler Münster) is a religious building in the Swiss city of Basel, originally a Roman Catholic cathedral and today a Reformed Protestant church.

The original cathedral was built between 1019 and 1500 in Romanesque and Gothic styles. The late Romanesque building, destroyed by the 1356 Basel earthquake, was rebuilt by Johannes Gmünd, who was at the same time employed for building the Freiburg Münster. Ulrich von Ensingen, architect of the towers at Ulm Minster and Strasbourg Cathedral, extended the building from 1421. Hans Nußdorf completed the southern Martinstower (after St.Martin) in 1500.

One of the main landmarks and tourist attractions of Basel, it adds definition to the cityscape with its red sandstone architecture and coloured roof tiles, its two slim towers and the cross-shaped intersection of the main roof. The Swiss inventory of cultural property of national and regional significance lists the Münster as a heritage site of national significance.

== Building history ==
=== Early structures ===
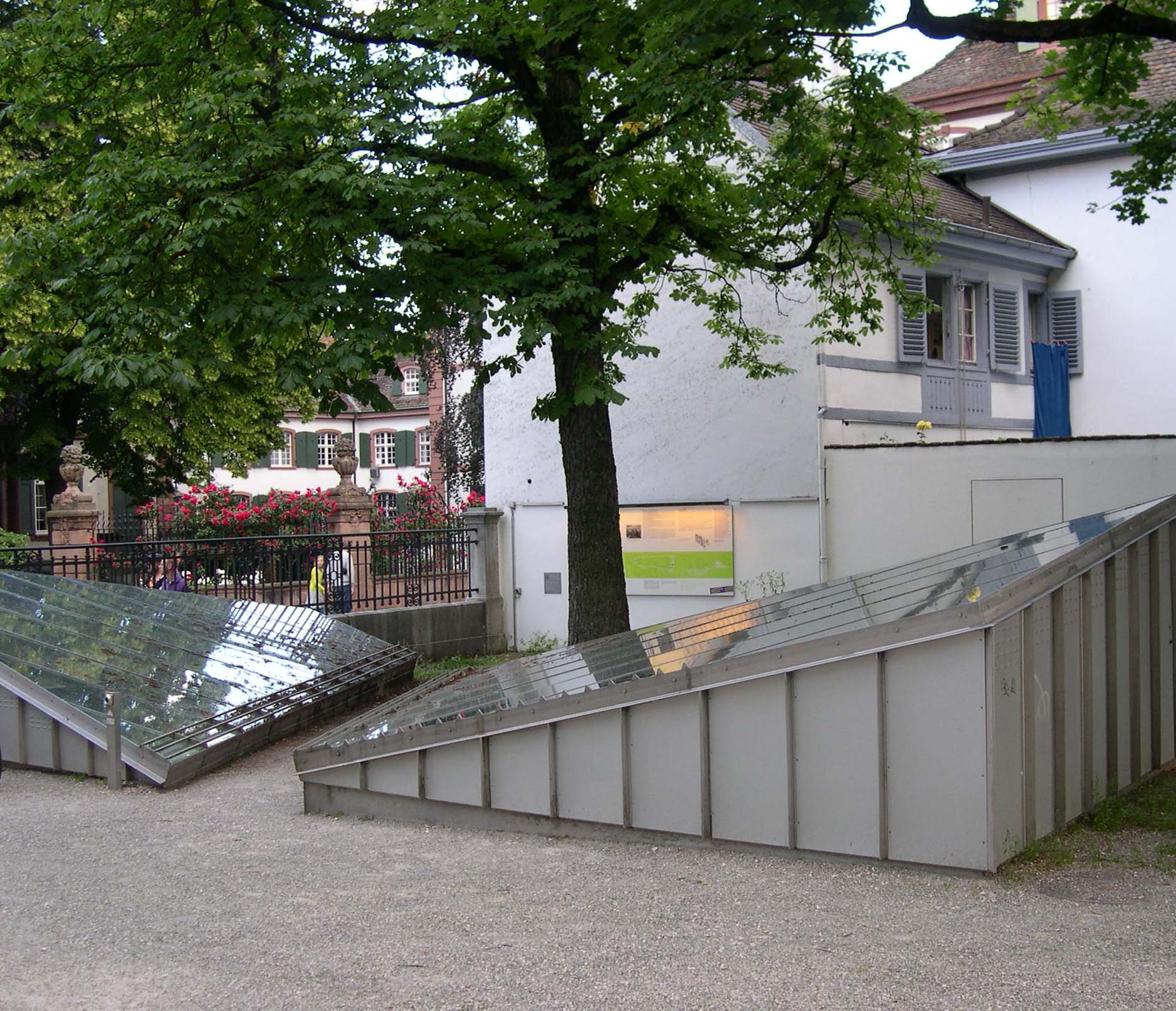
Gallic wall near the Minster

The hill on which the Minster is located today was a Celtic fortified city in the late Celtic Era in first century BC. The Gallic wall of this city was uncovered during archeological excavations in 1970. Both, the gate site and the historical run of the street, can be partly retraced. This road parted at today's position of the Minster where it is presumed there was a small temple that later was replaced by a Roman fort.

The first bishop of Basel is claimed to be Justinianus (343–346 AD). The bishop's see was relocated from Augusta Raurica (today Kaiseraugst) to Minster hill during the Early Middle Ages. According to the archeologist Hans Rudolf Sennhauser this transfer presumably took place at the beginning of the 7th century under bishop Ragnacharius, a former monk of monastery Luxeuil. There is no historical evidence for the existence of a cathedral before the 9th century.

=== Second church structure – the Heinrich Münster ===
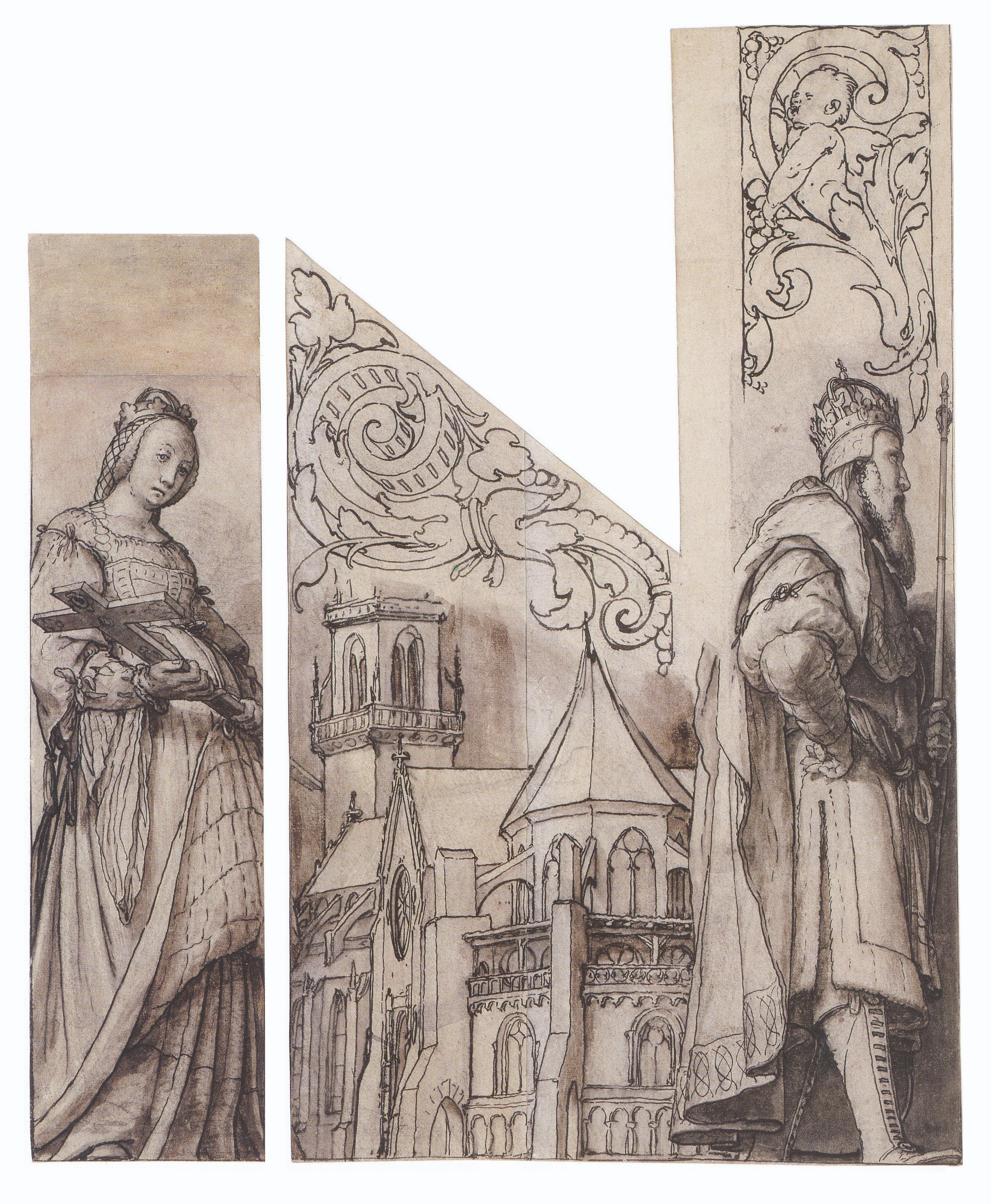
Design for organ shutters for Basel Minster by Hans Holbein the Younger, c. 1525–26. Holbein includes a view of the cathedral between its founders Kunigunde and Henry II.

Built on the old foundations of the Haito Minster some time after the turn of the first millennium a new building in the early Romanesque style of the Ottonian period was built by order of Bishop Adalberto II (c. 999–1025). Sometimes called “Adalberto Cathedral”, the three-nave cathedral is actually named after its patron Emperor Henry II, in German “Heinrich”. The cathedral is dedicated to Henry II and his wife Kunigunde. The prince-bishop governed the city as representative of the Emperor who gained possession of Basel in 1006.

Excavations from 1973 to 1974 prove that the crypt of this building, consecrated in 1019, had not been expanded. At the end of the 11th century a tower made of light-colored limestone and molasse was erected on the western side of the building. This historic structure remains forming the bottom part of the north tower (Georgsturm) today. Heinrich Minster did not possess a tower on the south side.

=== Third church structure – late Romanesque ===
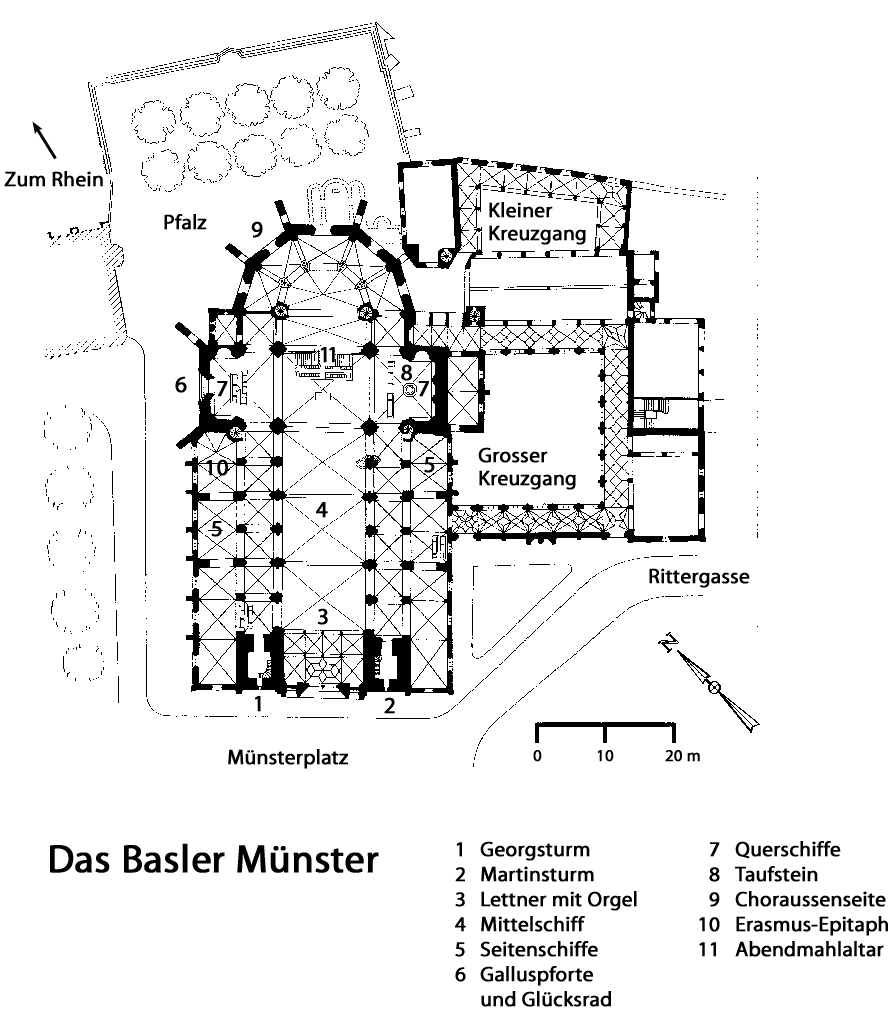
Minster plan

The building as it stands today dates back for the most part to the late Romanesque building constructed in the last third of the 12th century and completed around 1225. On the foundations of the previous buildings a church with three naves and a transept was built. The western facade was finished sometime in the latter part of the 13th century. A third storey was added to northern Georgsturm, and the southern Martinsturm was started.

Even though supported by massive pillars, an earthquake in 1356 destroyed five towers, the choir and various vaults. Johannes Gmünd, who was also the architect of Freiburg Minster, rebuilt the damaged cathedral and in 1363 the main altar was consecrated. In 1421 Ulrich von Ensingen, who constructed the towers of the minsters in Ulm and Strasbourg, began the extension of the northern tower (Georgsturm). This phase ended in 1429. The southern tower (Martinsturm) was completed by Hans Nussdorf on 23 July 1500. This date marks the official architectural completion of the minster. In the 15th century the major and the minor cloisters were added. The minster served as a bishop’s see until 1529 during the Reformation. Today's congregation forms part of the Evangelical-Reformed Church of the Canton Basel-Stadt. In the 19th century two major restorations took place. From 1852 until 1857 the rood screen was moved and the crypt on the western side was closed. In the 20th century the main aim of renovations has been to emphasize the late Romanesque architecture and to reverse some modifications made in the 1850s. Additionally, the floor was returned to its original level in 1975 and the crypt reopened. A workshop dedicated to taking care of the increasingly deteriorating sandstone exterior was set up in 1985.

== Important historical events ==
=== Pope's Election at Basel Cathedral ===
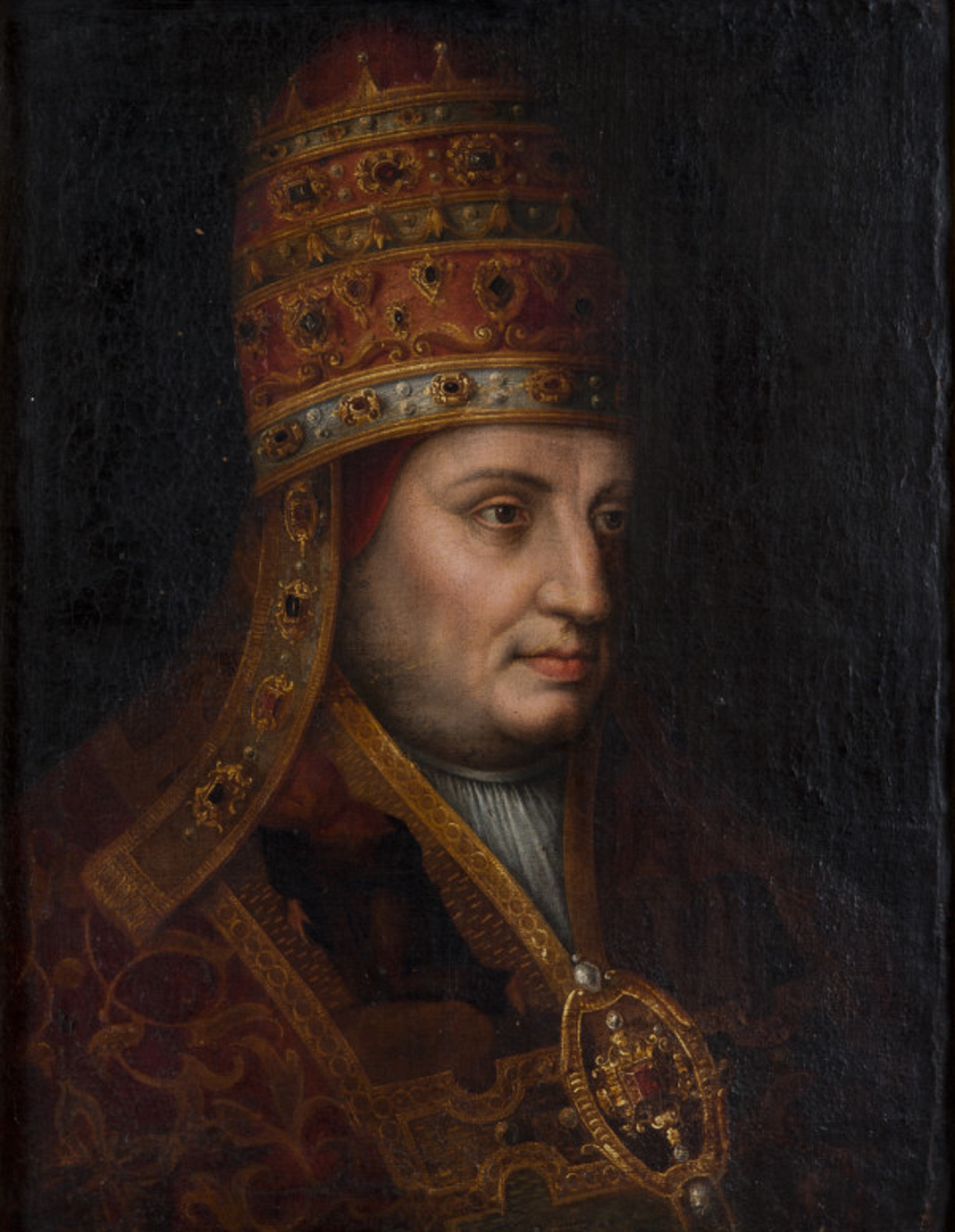
Antipope Felix V

In 1424, Pope Martin V informed Basel’s government that their city has been chosen to be the site of the next council. The main goal of the meetings held by Basel’s council between 1431 and 1449 was to implement a church reform. Following the orders of Pope Eugene IV, president of the council at that time, Julian Cesarini, left Basel in 1438. One year later, on 24 July 1440, Felix V was elected as a counter pope at Basel’s Münsterplatz. The German Emperor, Frederick III, arranged for the dissolution of the council in Basel because Felix V could not prevail. After the closure of the pontifical university, citizens made an effort to establish a new university. The council’s secretary, Pope Pius II, made it possible to enact the papal bull and to open the Basel University as an independent university on 4 April 1460.

=== Destruction of religious paintings ===
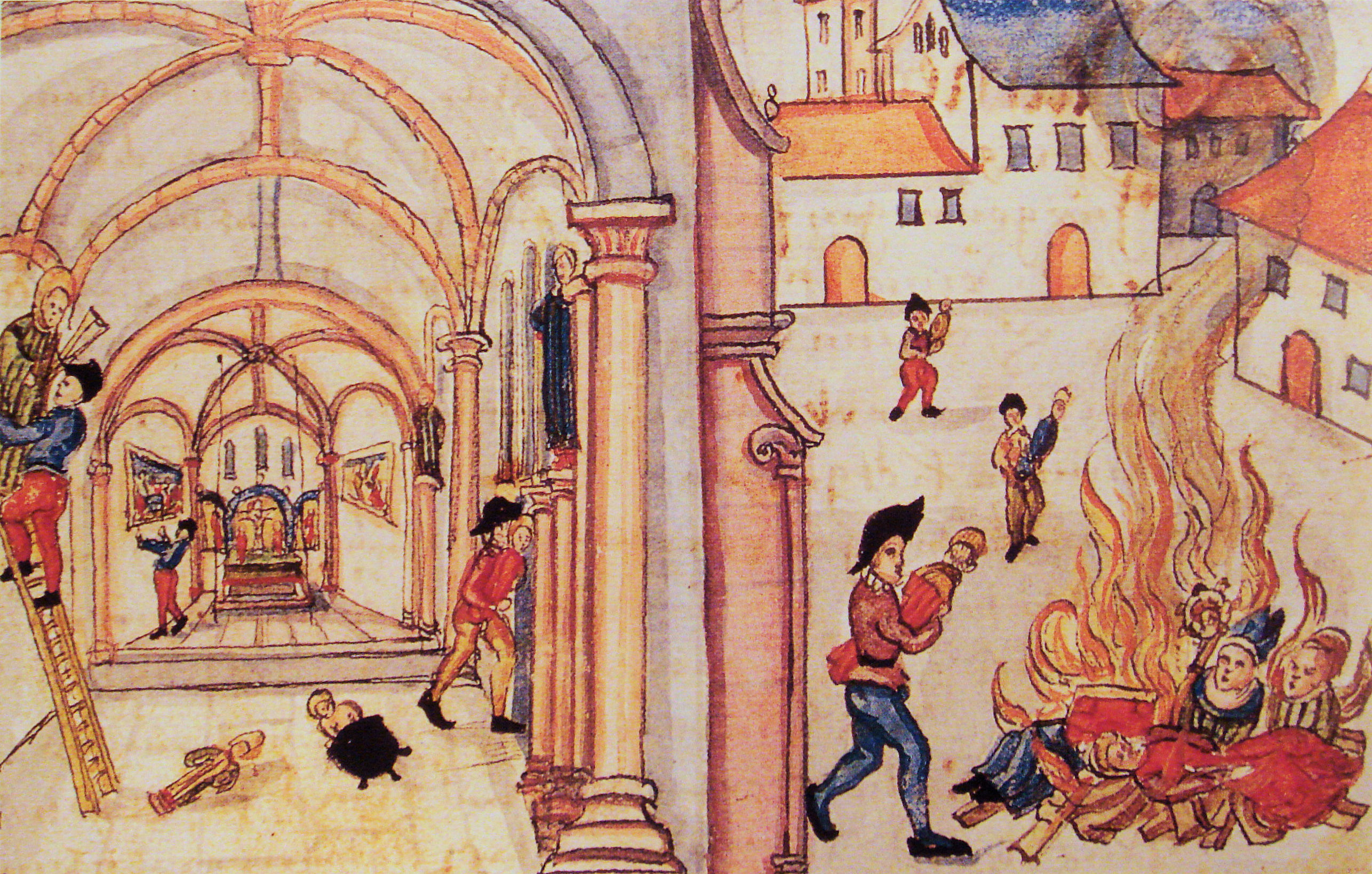
Iconoclasm in Zurich, 1524

During the iconoclasm of the Protestant Reformation, many valuable pieces of art belonging to the city of Basel and the minster were destroyed in 1528 and 1529. Numerous citizens stormed many of the churches in Basel, some of them by armed force in order to demolish religious paintings and statues. Huldrych Zwingli, an influential church reformer, condemned the worship of God in the form of pictures as idolatry.

A group of 40 armed men is said to have ascended to the minster from the crowded market place at approximately 1 pm on 9 February 1529. After a first attack on the church, during which an altarpiece was tipped over and smashed, they departed for reinforcements. The chaplains took the opportunity to lock the gates of the minster. The returning mob of 200 loud and rowdy men assaulted and finally smashed through the barrier. Once inside the church they destroyed altars, crucifixes, and images of the Virgin Mary and saints. In the course of the afternoon the iconoclasm extended to other churches in Basel as well.

The impressive treasure of the minster was saved and remained complete until the Canton of Basel was split into "half-cantons" in 1833. In the 1850s new stained glass windows by Franz Xaver Eggert have been installed.

== Architecture ==
=== Georgsturm and Martinsturm ===
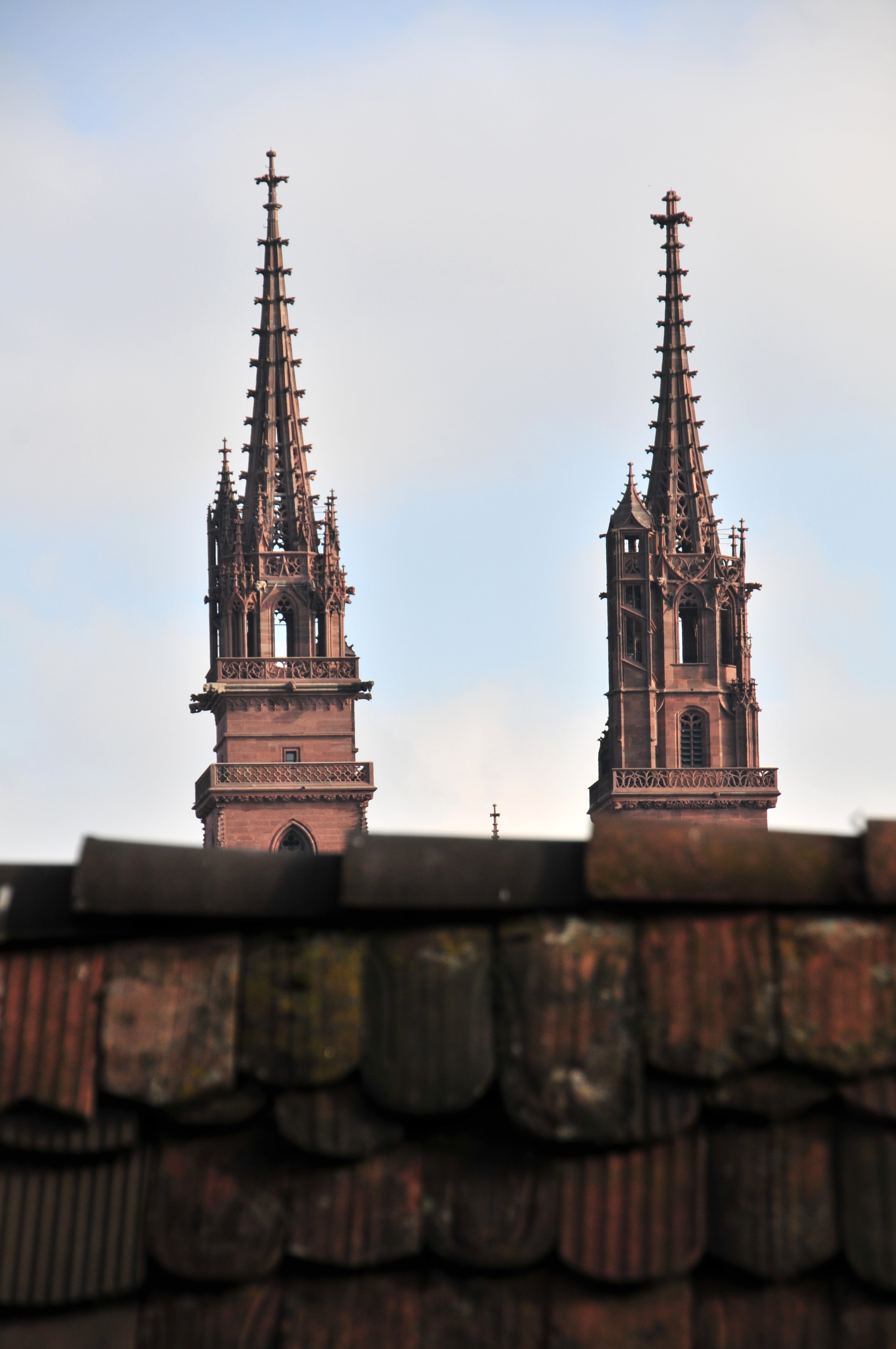
Martinsturm (62.7 m) and Georgsturm (64.2 m)

The main front which points at the west is bestrided by two towers. The northern tower is called Georgsturm (64.2 m) and the southern tower is called Martinsturm (62.7 m). The towers are named after Georg and Martin, saints of the knights. Copies of both saints are portrayed by corresponding equestrian sculptures next to the main entrance upon high pilasters below the particular towers. The statue of Holy Martin originated from the year 1340; today, the archetype can be found in the Klingentalmuseum. A mechanic clock and a sundial are located above the archetype. It is remarkable that the sundial of the Basler Münster shows the “wrong time” due to the Basler Zeit. Below the Georgsturm a monumental picture (1372) can be found which shows knight Georg fighting against a remarkably small dragon.

After a heavy earthquake in 1356 the Münster, which originally had five steeples, was reconstructed with only two steeples remaining. At the older Georgsturm, the lower brighter part that has remained untouched, can still be seen. In 1500 a gorgeous finial was put on top of the Martinsturm. By using the steep spiral stairs in the southern steeple it is possible to see the old church clock from 1883. The belfry is situated in between the two steeples which are connected through a gallery. Georgturm and Martinsturm can both be accessed by 242 stairs. From there one can get an overwhelming view of the city of Basel and the foothills of the Black Forest and the Jura Mountains.

Both of the steeples consist of three lower, undivided storeys and several Freigeschosse. The two lower storeys are simple and block-like. The steeples’ upper storeys soar up the tracery gallery. As those were not constructed simultaneously, they differ slightly in their outer appearance. In contrast to the southern steeple, the octagonally cross-sectioned steeple and the steeple topping attach only over a rectangle storey at the northern steeple. Comparable to the Freiburger Münster, lank Fialentürme project at the corners of the octagons.

=== Main Porch ===
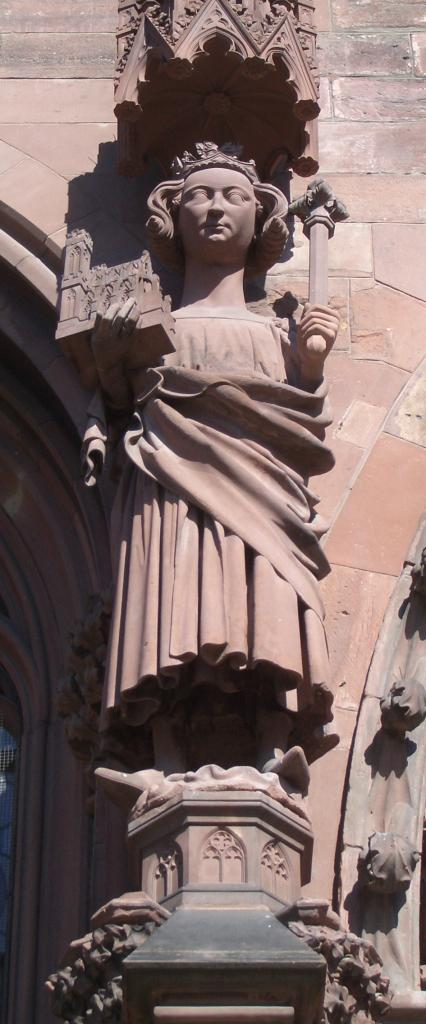
The benefactor Henry II at the main entrance

An empty column, which originally carried a statue of the Virgin Mary, is situated between the doors of the main porch. As it is typical of many other Gothic church porches, the tympanum above is likely to have depicted the Last Judgement. Both were destroyed during the Reformation Era. In contrast, the curvatures depicting prophets and kings, roses, dancing angels and Abraham have been preserved.

The benefactors Henry II and his wife, Empress Kunigunde, are portrayed left of the main porch. In the portrait, the emperor, depicted as a surprisingly young and beardless man, is carrying a church model in his arms, which identifies him as the benefactor. Only after the renovation of the exterior (1880 – 1980), the empress was given a cross as another symbol of identification. Originally, she was carrying gloves.

On the right one can see the pictures of a seducer (“Prince of this World") and a misguided virgin.

While the virgin smiles and starts to undress, toads and snakes crawl in the back of the seducer. They should embody the evil. The image dates back to roughly 1280. The statues and brickwork of the cathedral consist of red sandstone which was found in Wiesental and Degerfelden.

== Uses ==
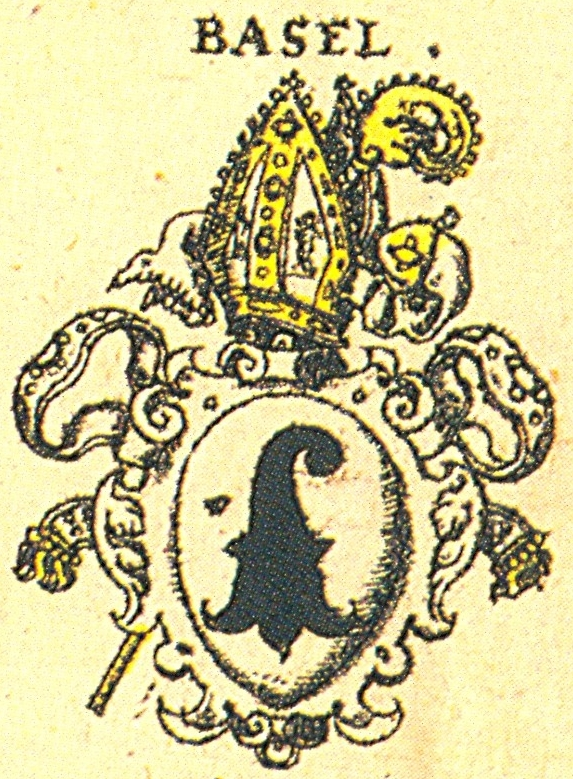
Coat of arms of the Diocese of Basel from 1605

Until the Reformation, Basel Minster was the church of the bishop and the main church of the Diocese of Basel, whose metropolitan bishop was the Archbishop of Besançon. The bishop’s residence and the original living quarters for the canons of the cathedral chapter were part of the Minster. From the 12th century onwards, the canons lived in their own private homes in the vicinity of the cathedral.

On 9 February 1529, all religious images were removed from the cathedral and the Minster became the main congregation in the city of the Swiss Reformed Church, which has been the sole owner of the building ever since the separation of church and state. The City of Basel, however, still contributes three quarters of the building's maintenance costs. Currently the congregations of the Gellert Church and St. James Church, two other churches in Basel, also make up part of the congregation of the Minster. Regular services and special musical events take place in the church throughout the year. The church also hosts many concerts of the church choir, choral society and various other church organisations.

== Burials ==
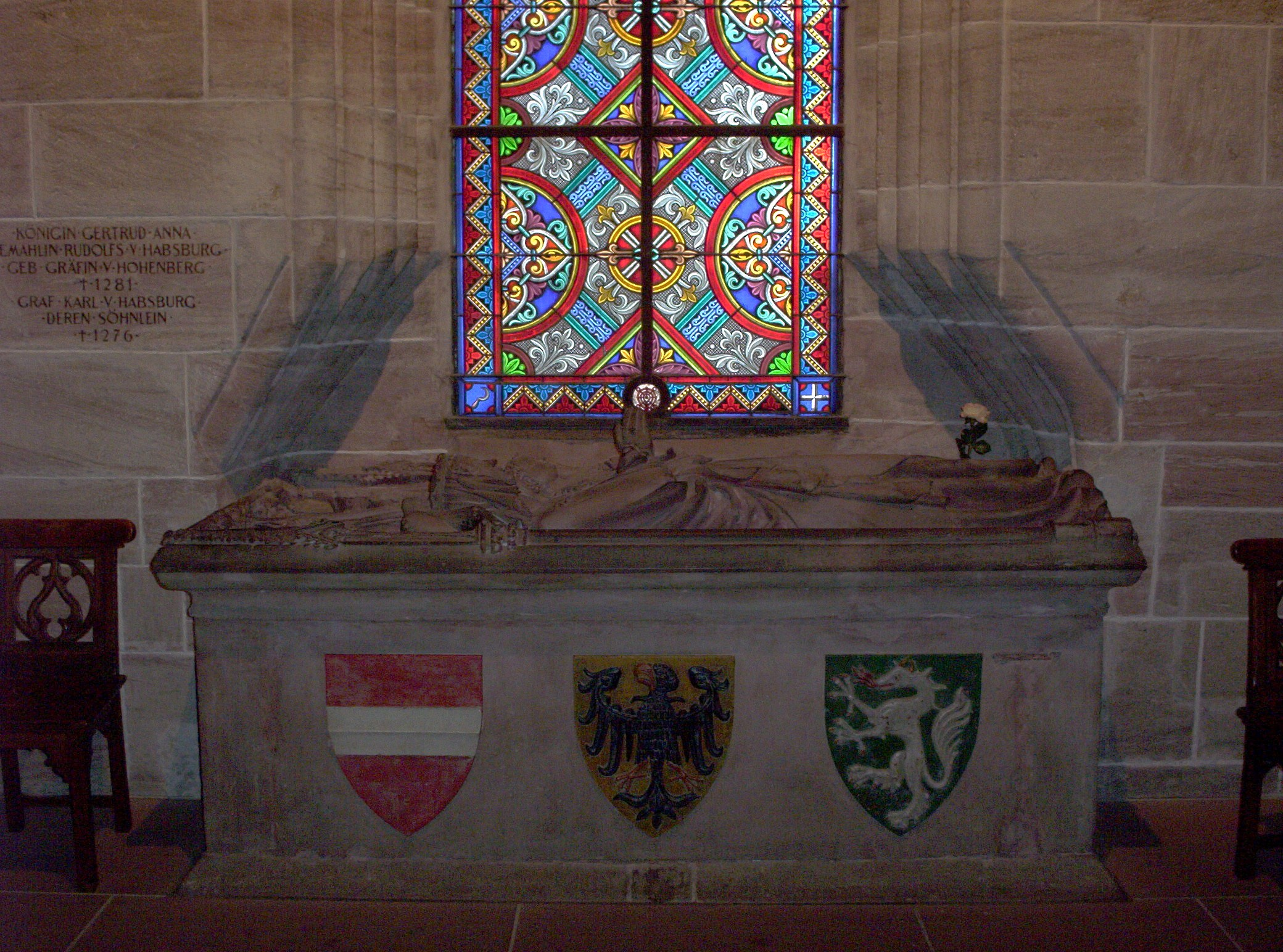
Tomb of Gertrude of Hohenberg

In the choir passage is the sarcophagus of Queen Anne of Habsburg and her son Charles. She had married in 1254 as Gertrude of Hohenberg the future King Rudolf of Habsburg and died in 1281 in Vienna. From there, her body was transferred to Basel. The bones found in her grave (a woman, a child, a man) were transferred in 1770 to Saint Blaise Abbey, Black Forest; later on to Saint Paul's Abbey, Lavanttal.

- Erasmus of Rotterdam
- Jacob Bernoulli

== Gallery ==
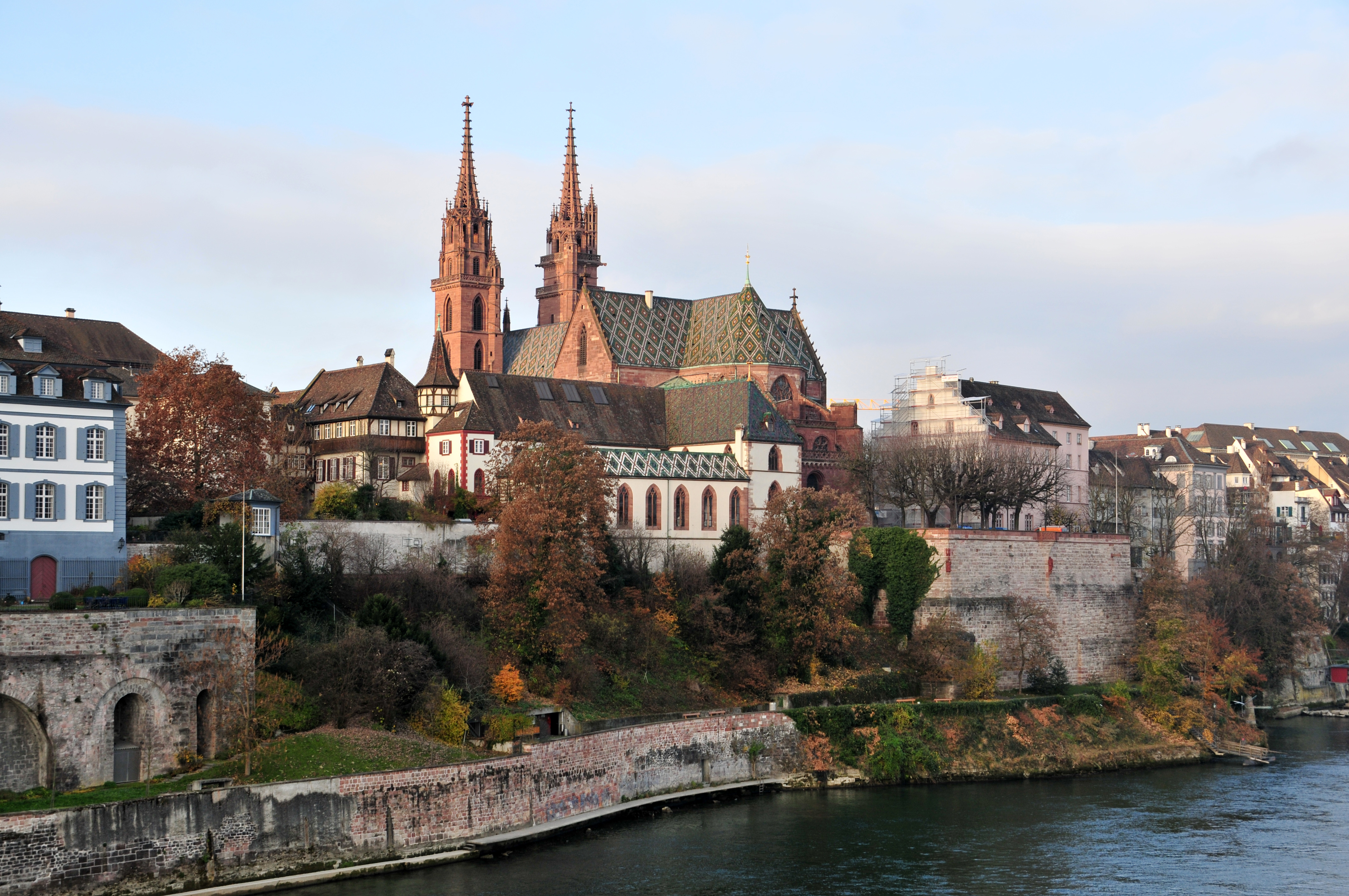

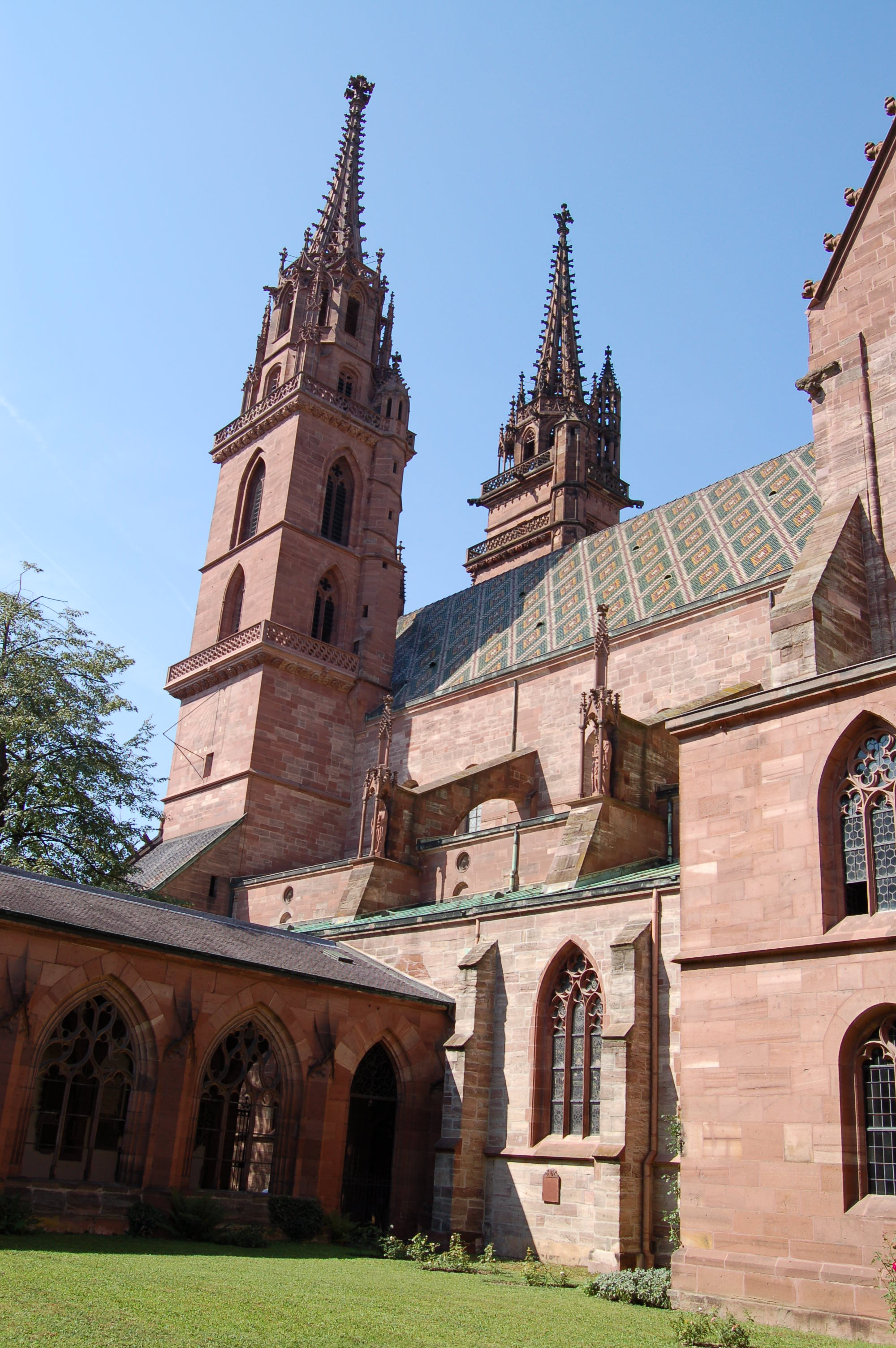

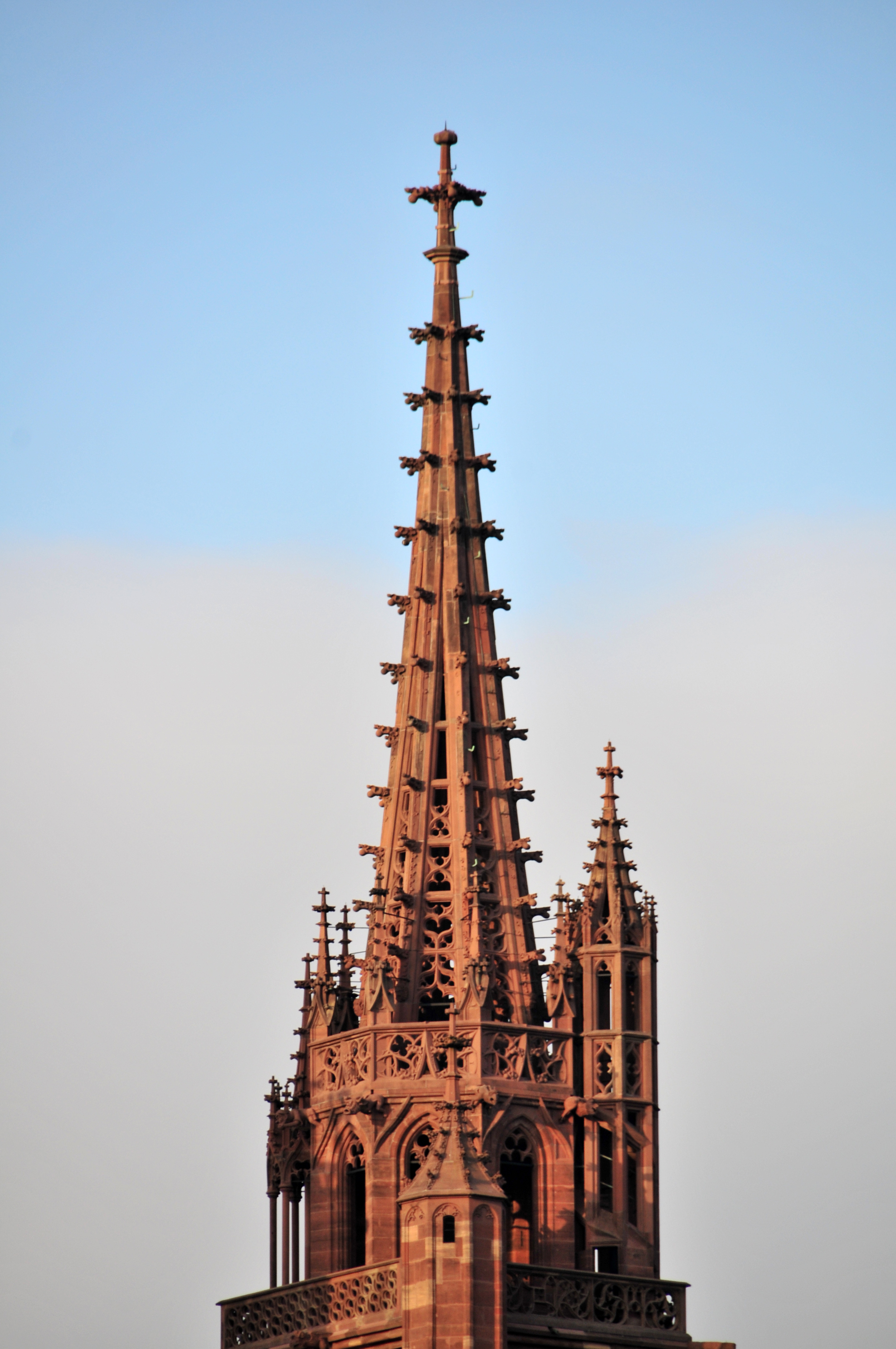

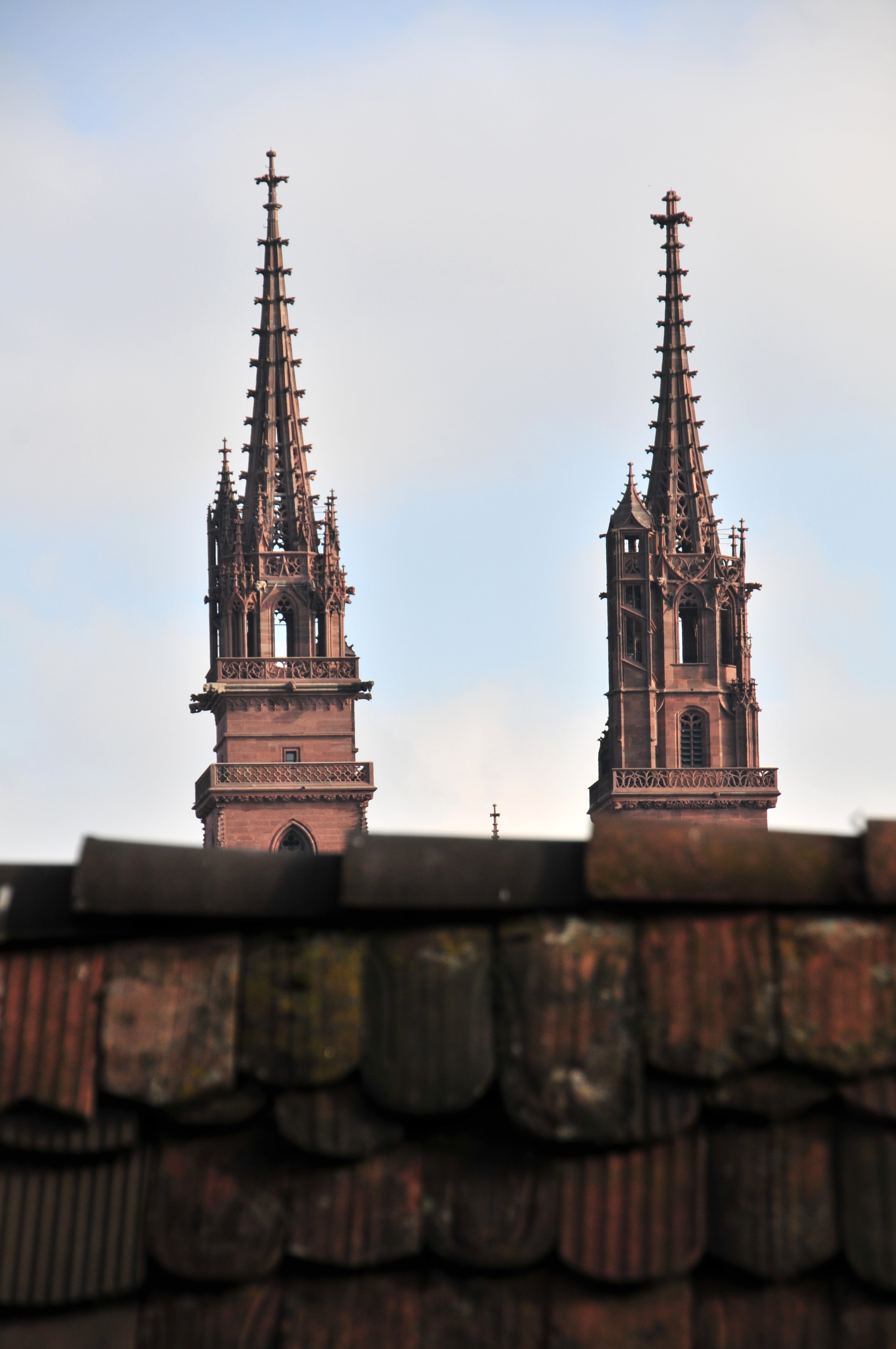

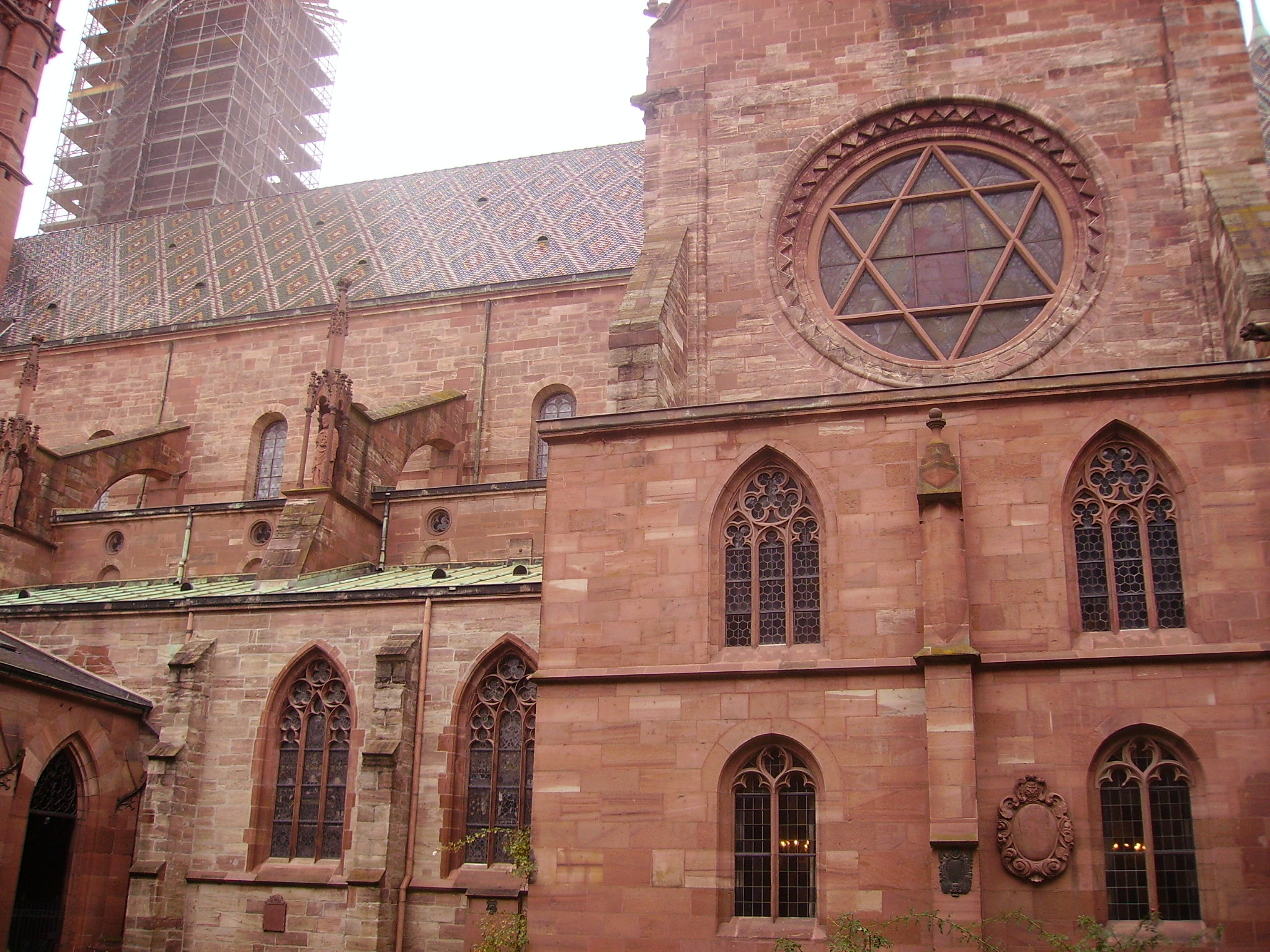

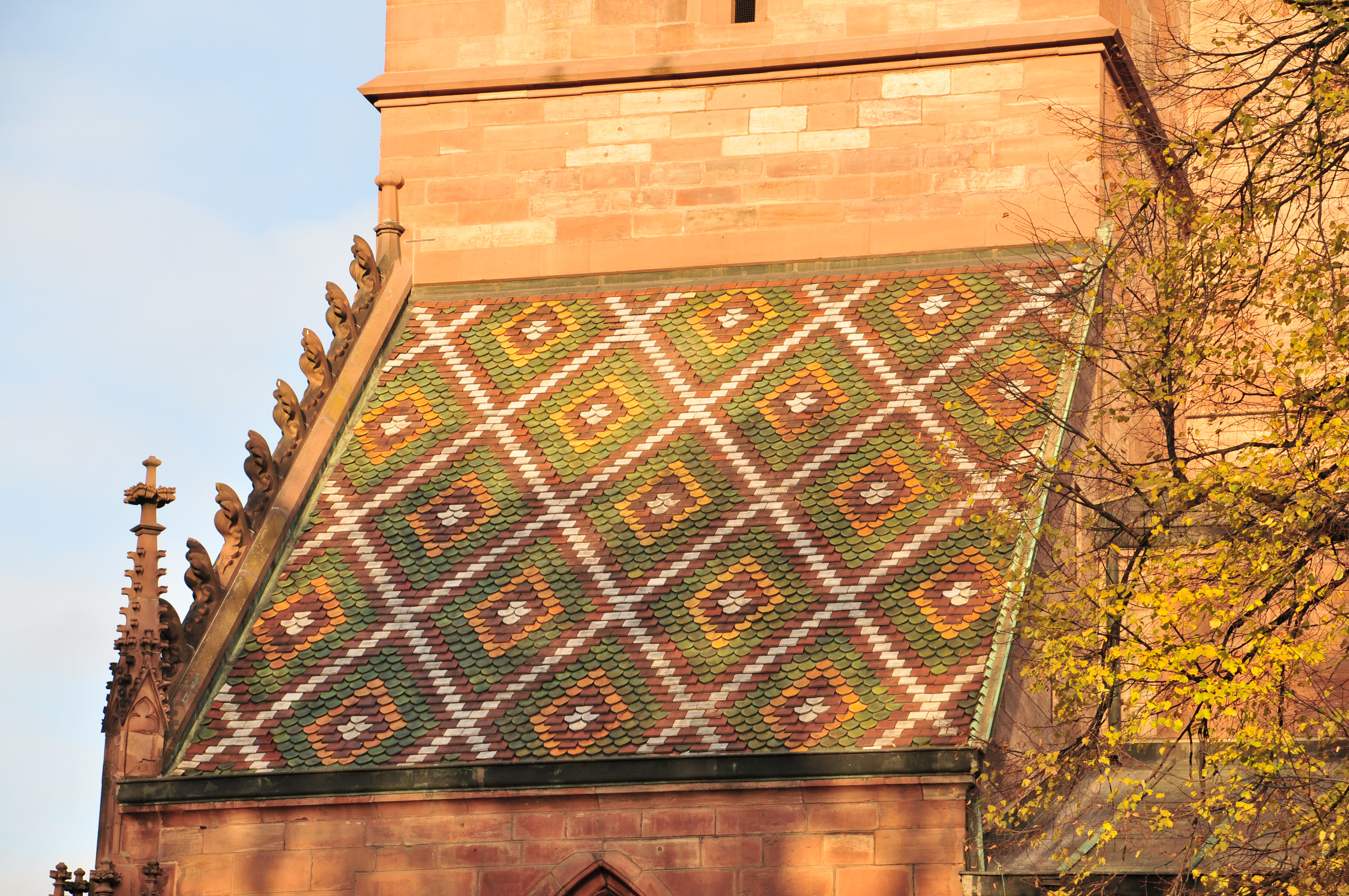

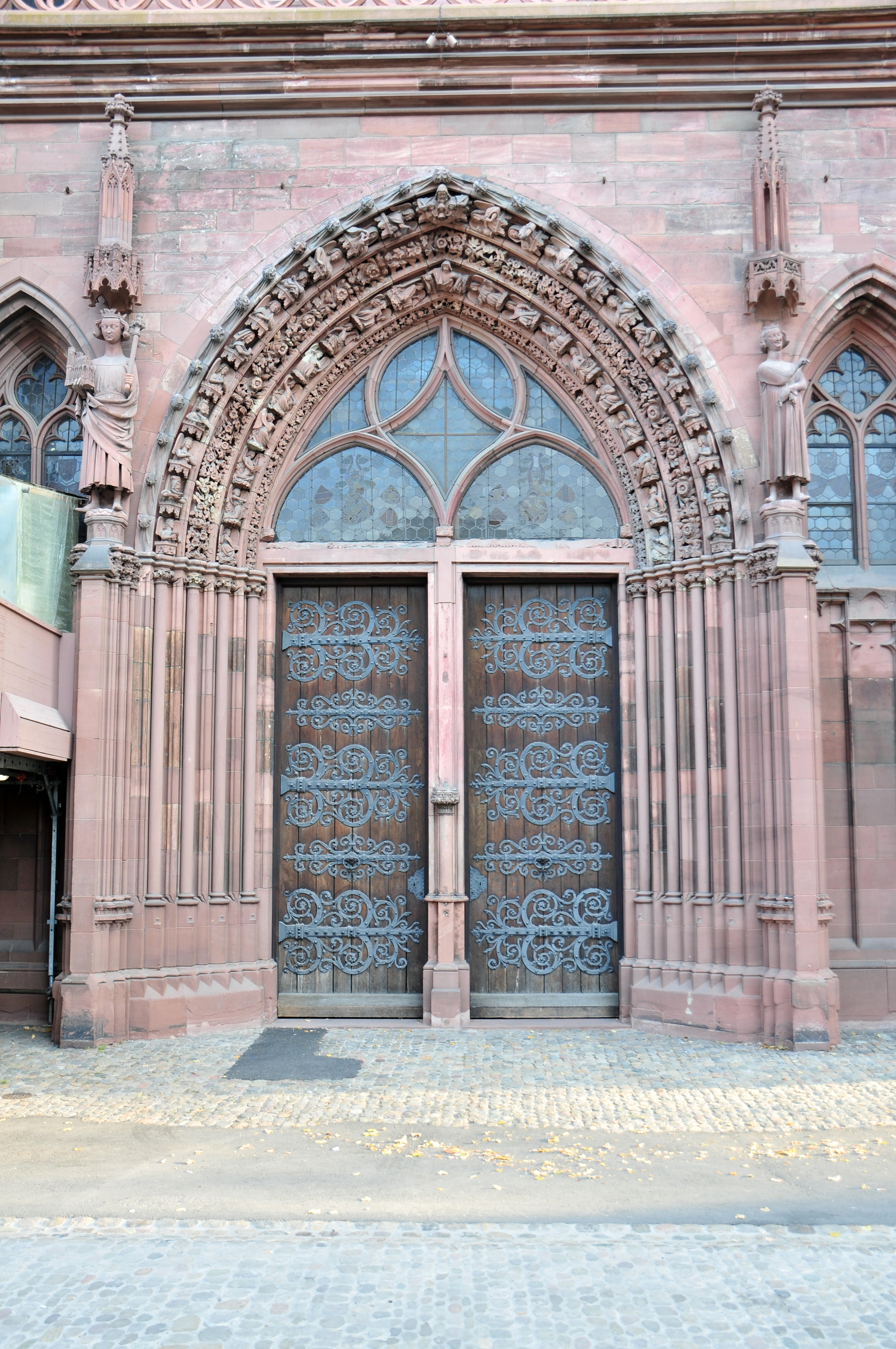

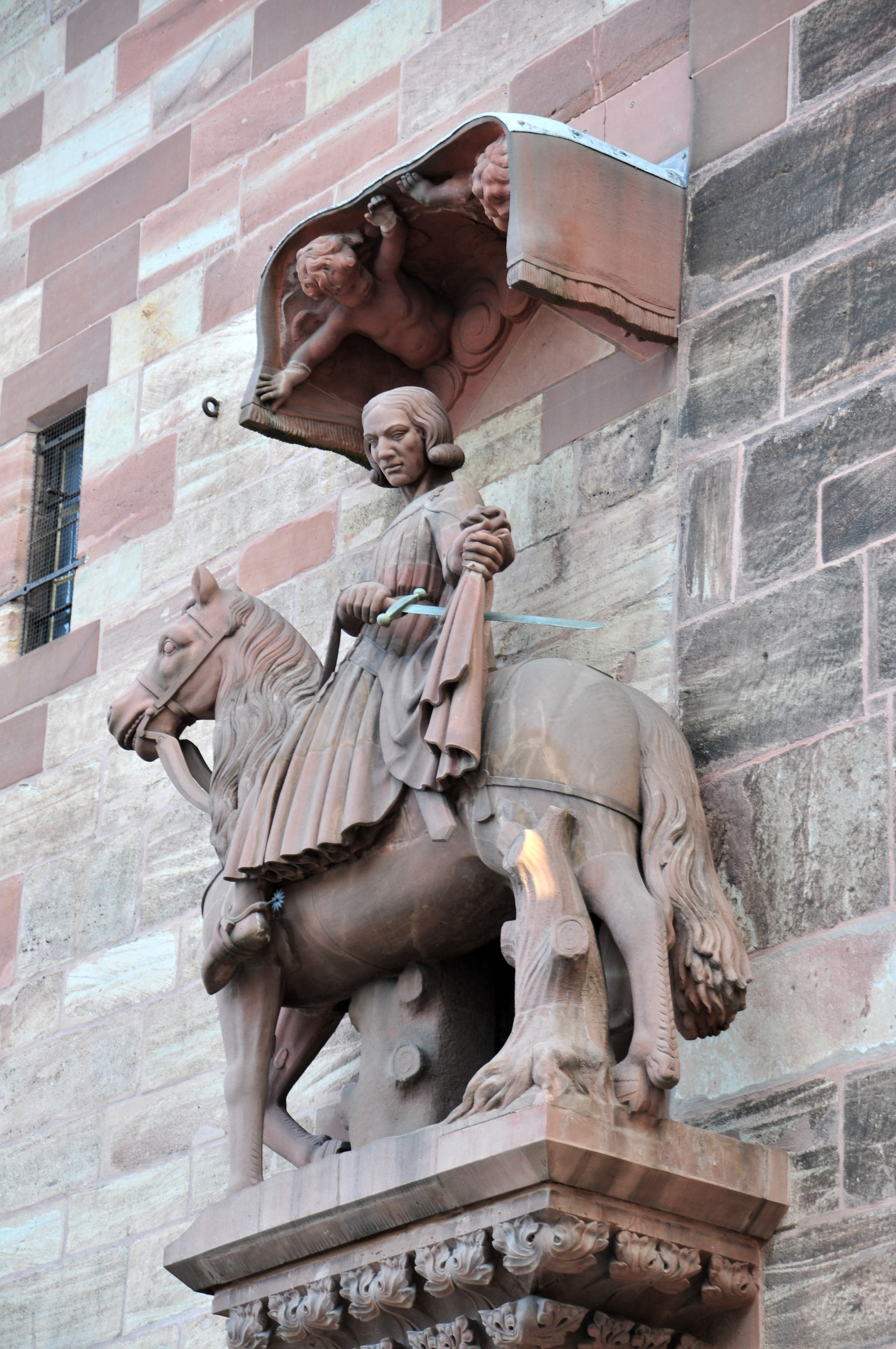

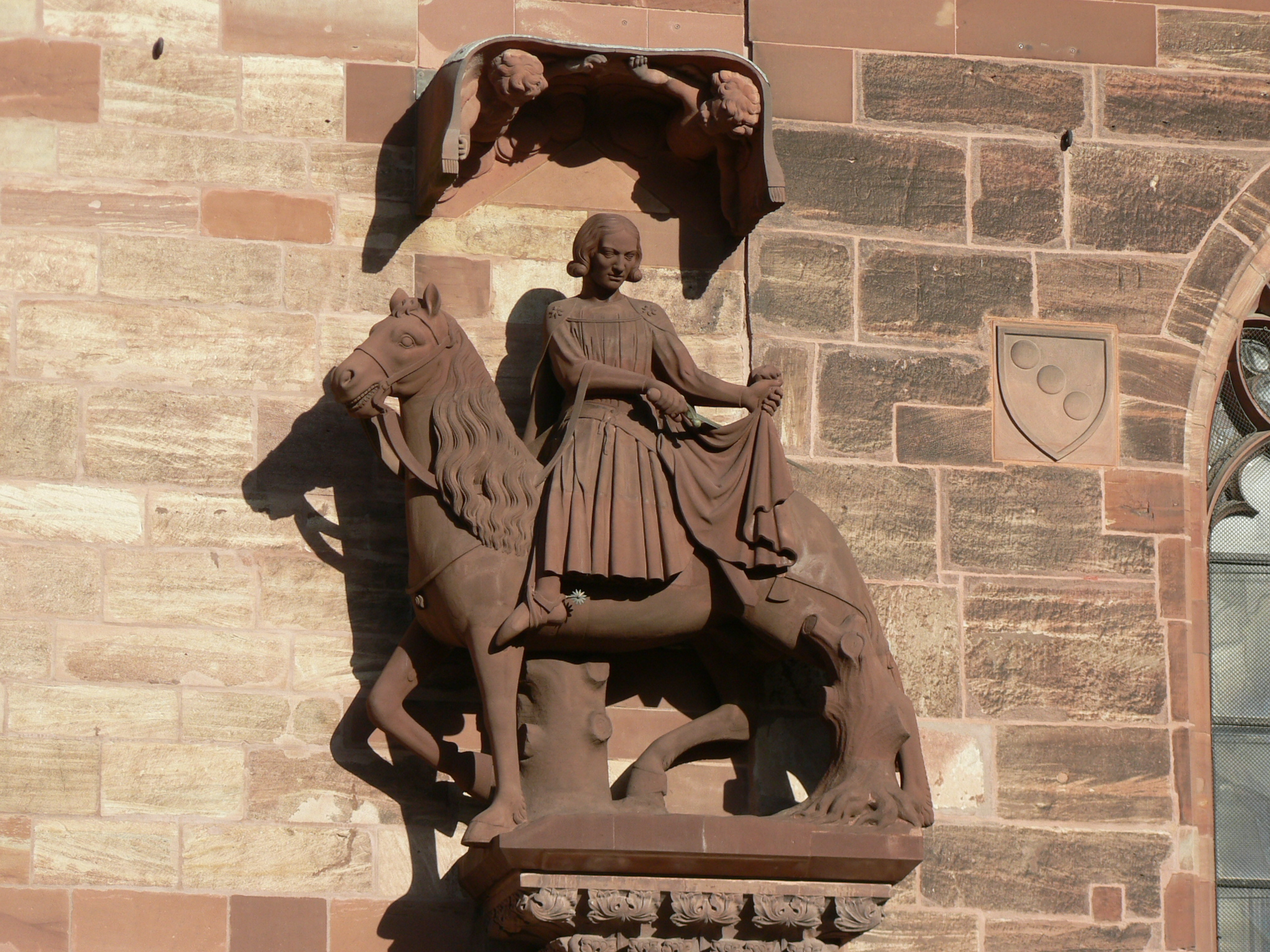

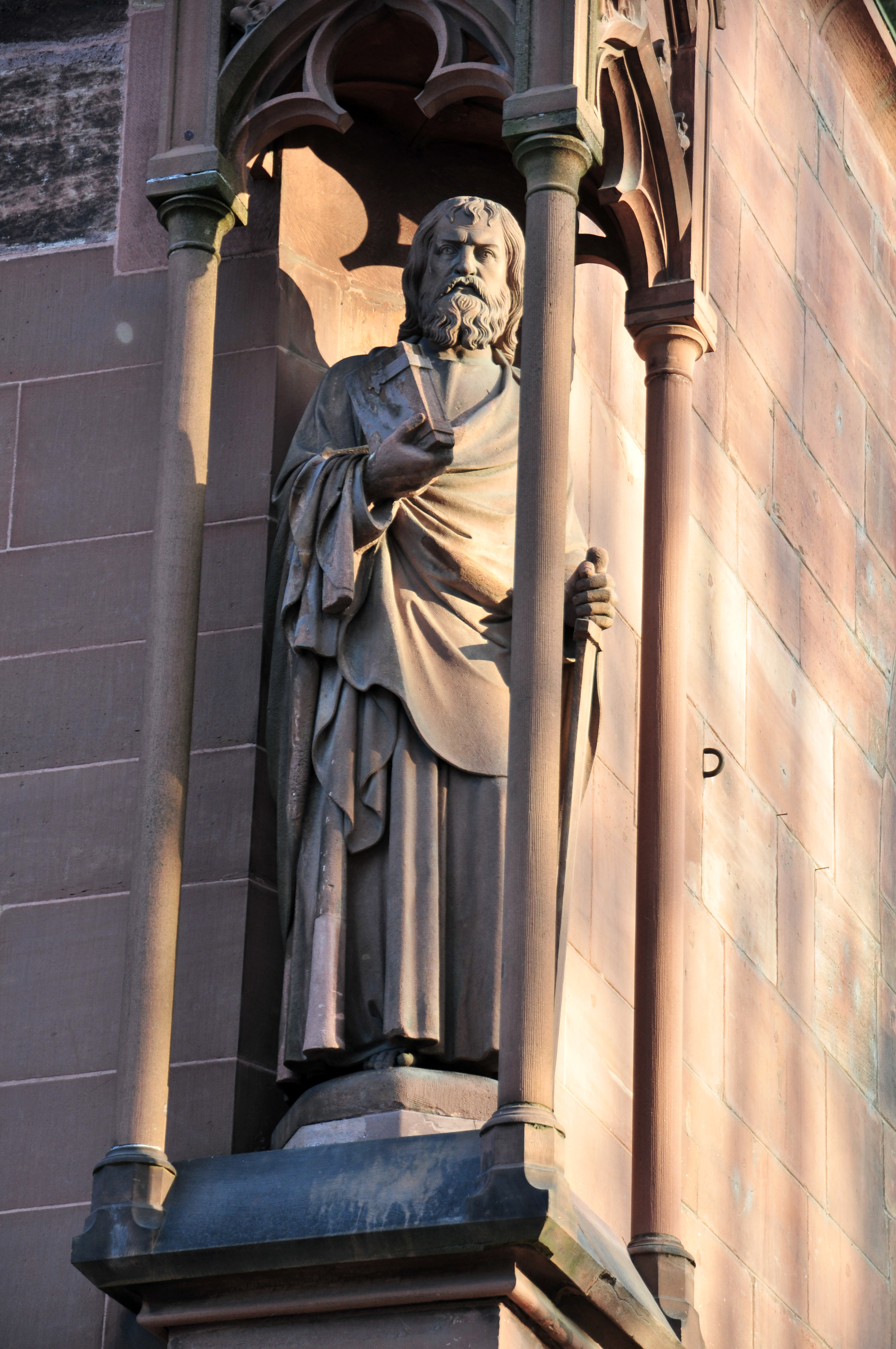

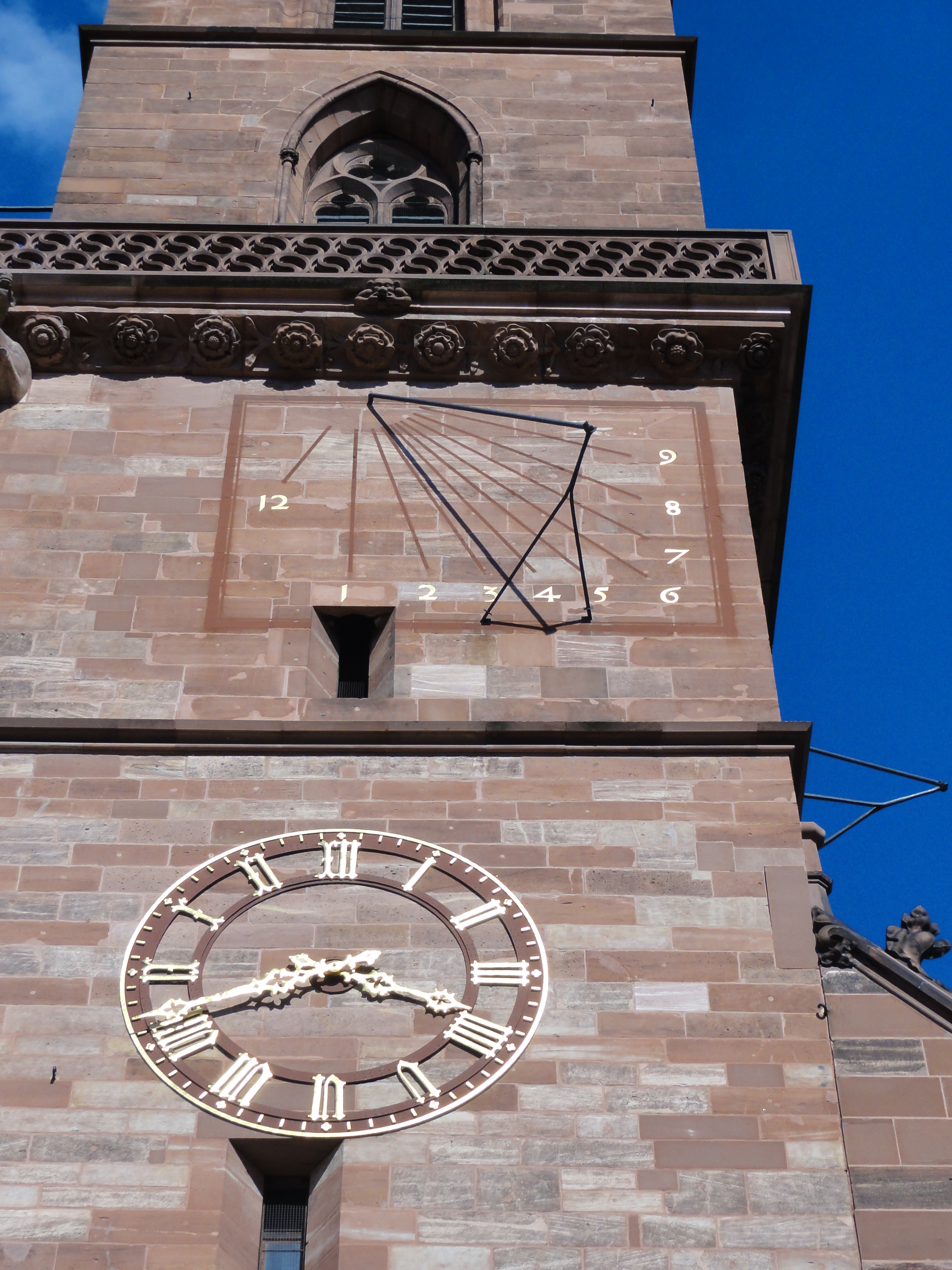

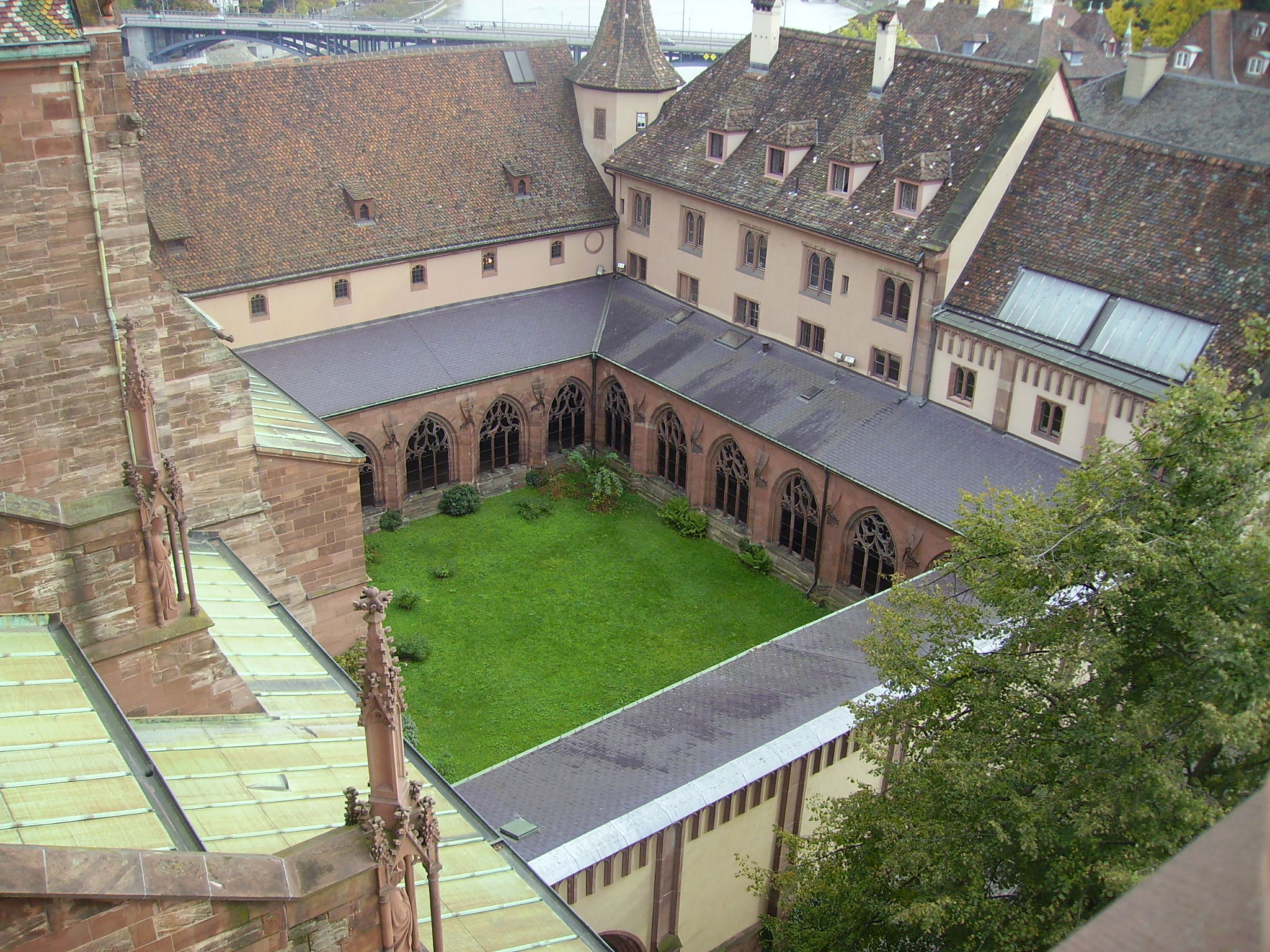

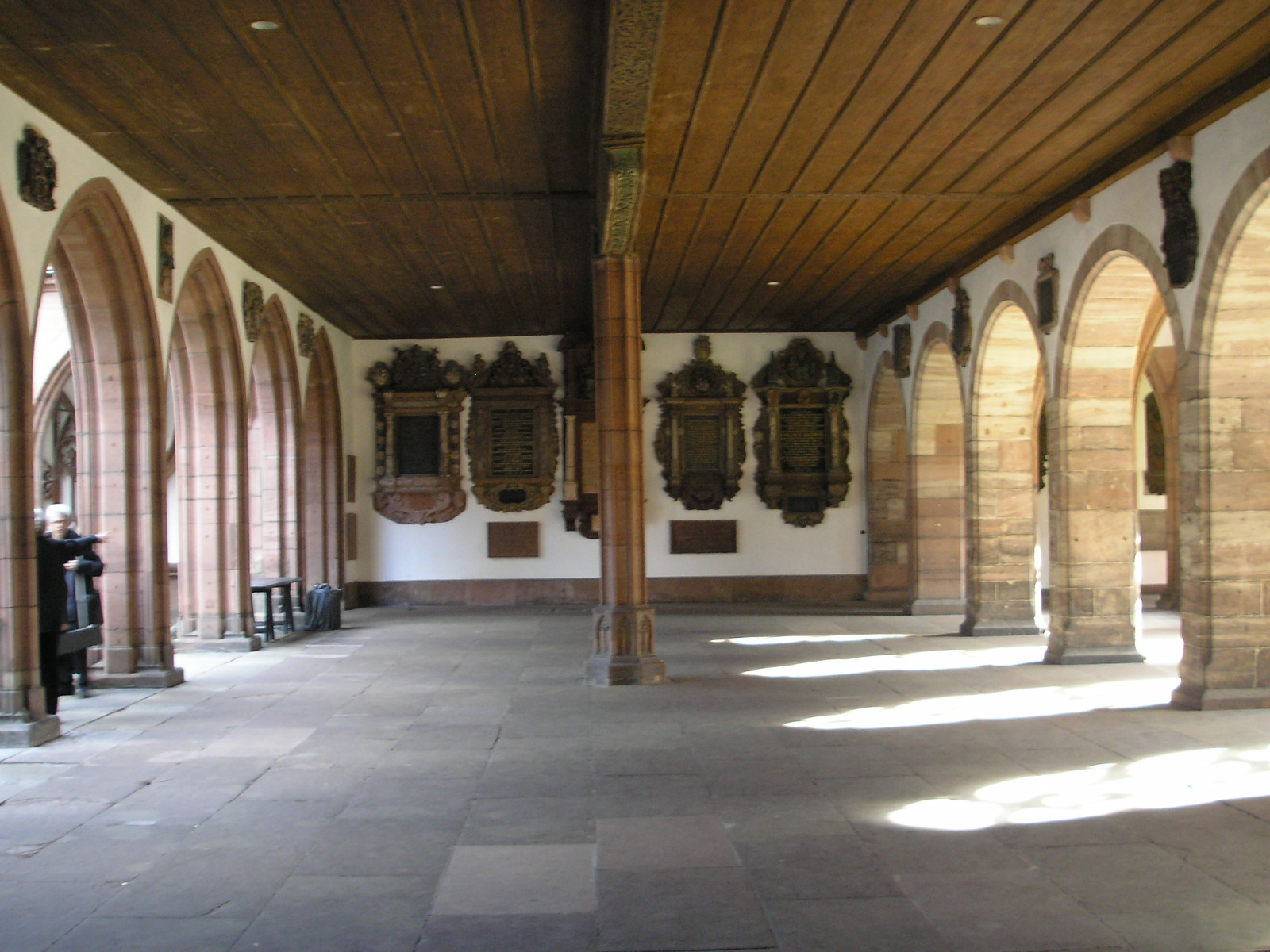

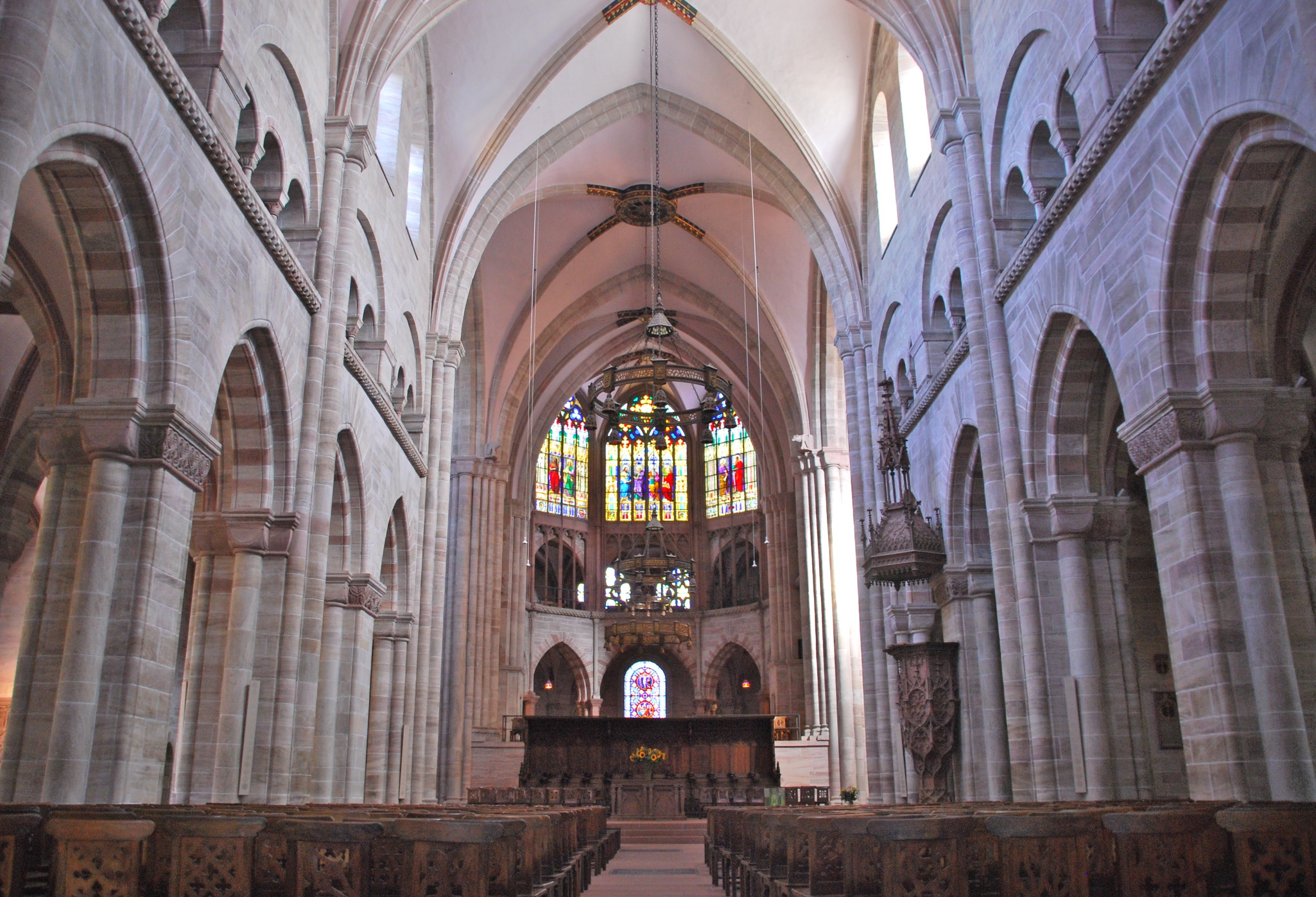
