= Otto Staiger =

Swiss painter and stained-glass artist

- Born: 3 September 1894; Basel, Switzerland
- Died: 5 September 1967 (aged 73); Basel, Switzerland
- Known for: Painting, stained glass

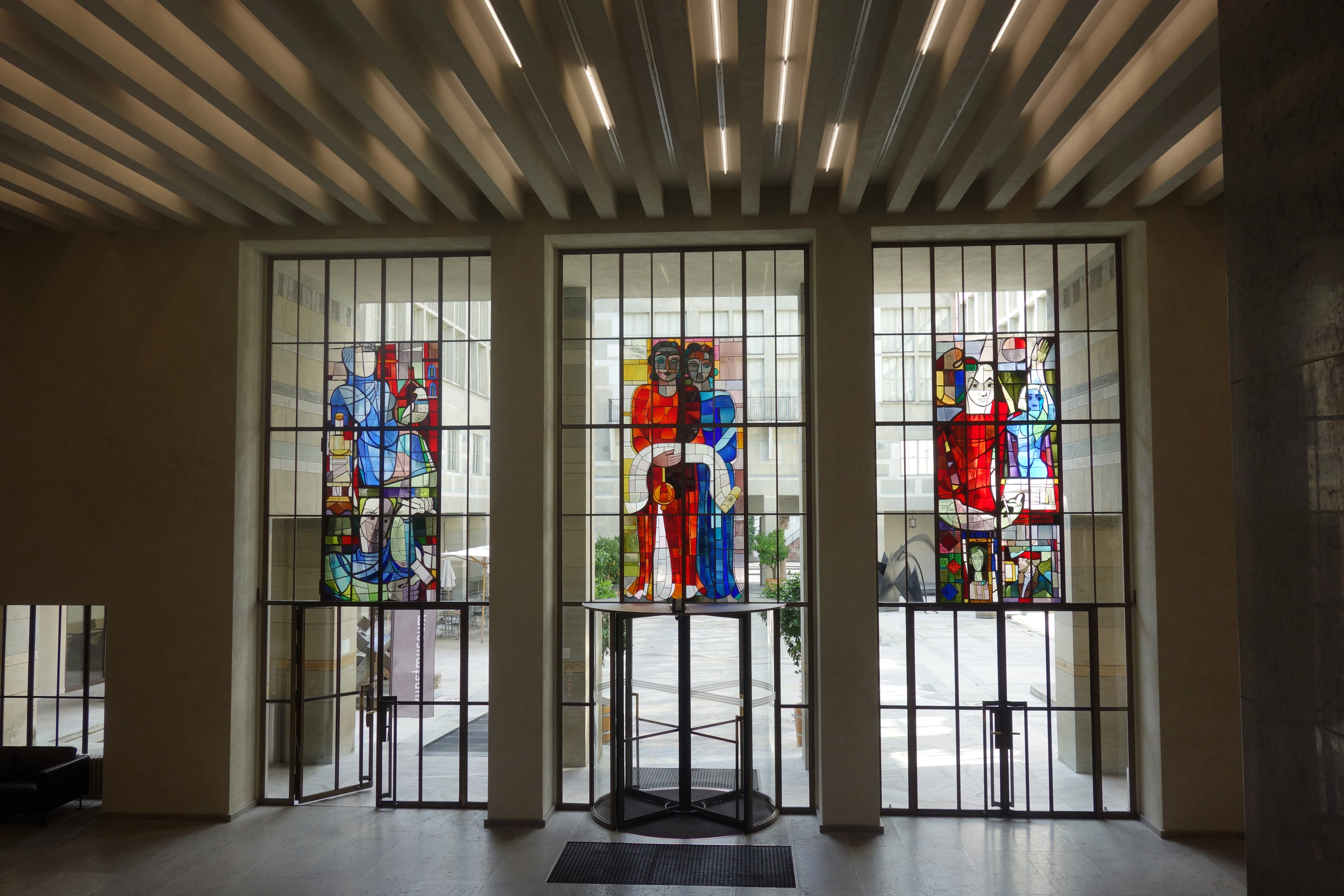
Entrance Kunstmuseum Basel, design by Otto Staiger and Charles Hindenlang

Otto Staiger (3 September 1894, Basel – 5 September 1967, Basel) was a Swiss painter and stained-glass artist. He joined Gruppe Rot-Blau in 1925 and was a co-founder of Gruppe Rot-Blau II and Gruppe 33. He is regarded as an important figure in the renewal of Swiss stained glass, and his public works include stained-glass windows for the Antoniuskirche in Basel.

== Biography ==
Otto Staiger was born in Basel on 3 September 1894. After the death of his father, he began an apprenticeship as a stained-glass painter in his uncle’s workshop at the age of 17. From 1912 to 1914, he trained as a stained-glass painter and attended the Gewerbeschule in Basel. During the First World War, he served on active duty while also taking painting lessons from Hermann Meyer.

From 1919 to 1922, Staiger lived in Geneva with the painter Hans Stocker. He won first prize at the Concours Diday in 1921. Staiger married Frieda Hunziker in 1922. He lived in Ticino from 1922 and returned to Basel in 1927.

Staiger joined Gruppe Rot-Blau in 1925. He was a co-founder of Gruppe Rot-Blau II in 1928 and Gruppe 33 in 1933. In 1938, he opened his own stained-glass workshop in Basel. He died in Basel on 5 September 1967.

== Work ==
Staiger worked primarily as a painter and stained-glass artist. His training as a stained-glass artist strongly shaped his art. During his association with Gruppe Rot-Blau, his palette became stronger and his forms more disciplined. From the mid-1940s, he produced few oil paintings, while his stained-glass work from the 1950s also included non-figurative compositions.

He is regarded as an important figure in the renewal of Swiss stained glass. His public works include six stained-glass windows for the Antoniuskirche in Basel between 1926 and 1929, including one made together with Hans Stocker. Other public commissions in Basel included ''Badende Knaben'' at the Wettsteinschule in 1931, ''Ernte'' at the Berufs- und Frauenfachschule in 1933–1934, and ''Lebenslinien'' at the Holbeingymnasium in 1960–1961. In 1964, Staiger completed an eight-part stained-glass cycle for the Mädchenoberschule in Basel, now the Fachmaturitätsschule.
