= Walter Kurt Wiemken =

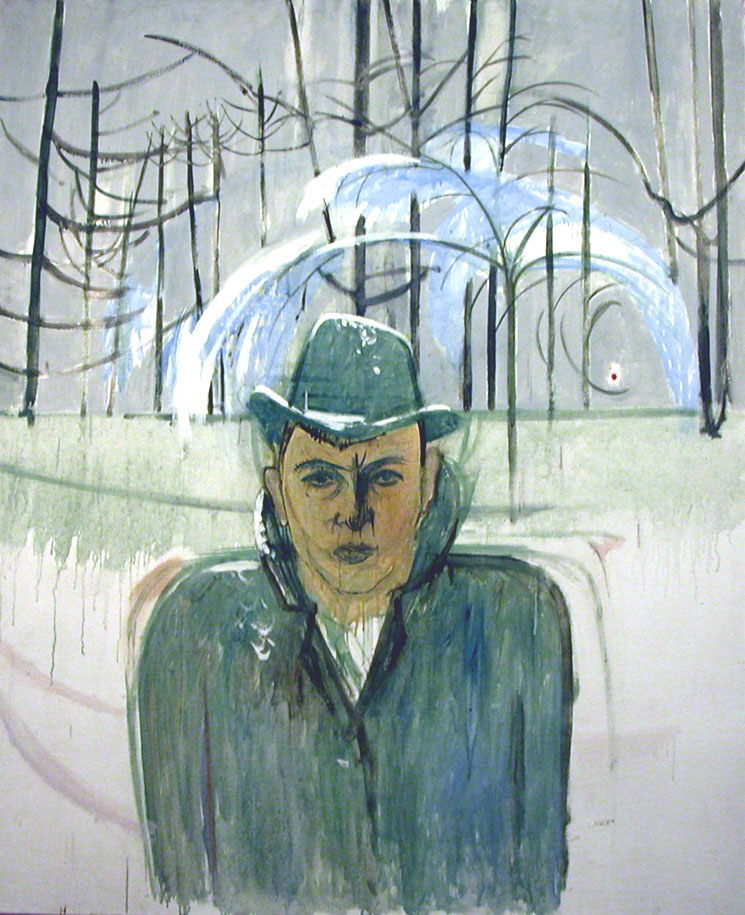
- Self-portrait (1939)
- Born: 14 September 1907; Basel, Switzerland
- Died: 30 December 1940 (aged 33); Castel San Pietro, Switzerland
- Known for: Painting

Walter Kurt Wiemken (14 September 1907 – 30 December 1940) was a Swiss painter.

== Life ==
Walter Kurt Wiemken was born in Basel in 1907 to German parents who had gained Swiss citizenship in 1898. He became seriously ill with polio at the age of four months, which led to a lifelong disability. He lived in his parents' home until his death and also built his art studio there. His father owned a lithography business.

He studied at the vocational school in Basel from 1923 to 1927, where his graphics teacher was the painter Fritz Baumann, the founder of the Expressionist art group Das neue Leben (The new life). Accordingly, Wiemken's illustrations from this time show a clear Expressionist influence, and he associated with the Gruppe Rot-Blau, which had been founded by students of Ernst Ludwig Kirchner.

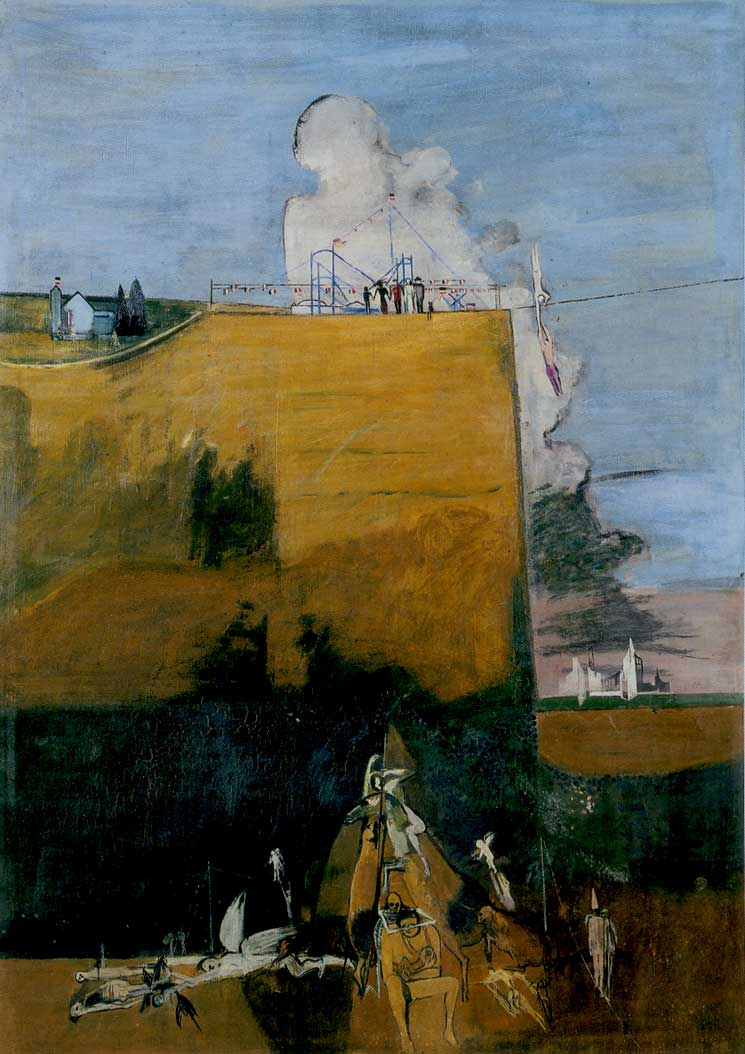
On the Edge of the Abyss (1936)

In 1927, he spent the summer semester at the State University of Applied Arts in Munich, where he was taught by Fritz Helmuth Ehmcke and Richard Klein. After his stay in Munich, he travelled to Paris with the painter Otto Abt, where he created his last Expressionist pictures. These were almost exclusively gloomy street scenes. After this, he turned to Impressionism. In 1928 and 1929, he travelled to the artists' colony of Collioure in Roussillon and to Ticino with lifelong friends Abt and Walter Bodmer. During these trips he painted fantastic landscapes. He and his friends visited Collioure several times until 1939.

One day, he saw a young girl's burial taking place while a butcher was going about his daily work nearby. This had a strong effect on his creative output. From then on, he aimed to represent the dichotomy of these simultaneous events of human life in his paintings. In the 1930s his art was influenced by the work of Serge Brignoni, Kurt Seligmann and Pablo Picasso, who in turn had been influenced by Surrealism. His work was characterised as showing both the light and dark sides of humanity. In 1936 he took part in the exhibition "Zeitprobleme in der Schweizer Malerei und Plastik" ("Time-dependent problems in Swiss painting and sculpture") at the Kunsthaus Zürich.

In 1933 he co-founded the Gruppe 33 with his friends Abt and Bodmer, as a protest against conservative trends in Swiss art and architecture (especially in Basel). Gruppe 33 were also staunchly anti-fascist. From 1936 to 1937 he was influenced by his friend Bodmer's constructivist art. He travelled to Belgium in 1937 and became interested in the surrealist art of James Ensor.

On 30 December 1940, he was reported missing after he went out alone for a walk. He had died from falling into the Breggia Gorge near Castel San Pietro and his corpse was not found until 23 January 1941.

He was internationally praised and exhibited and was one of the artists whose works were displayed at documenta 1 in Kassel (1955).
