= Hans Nussdorf =

Gothic architect (1420–1503)

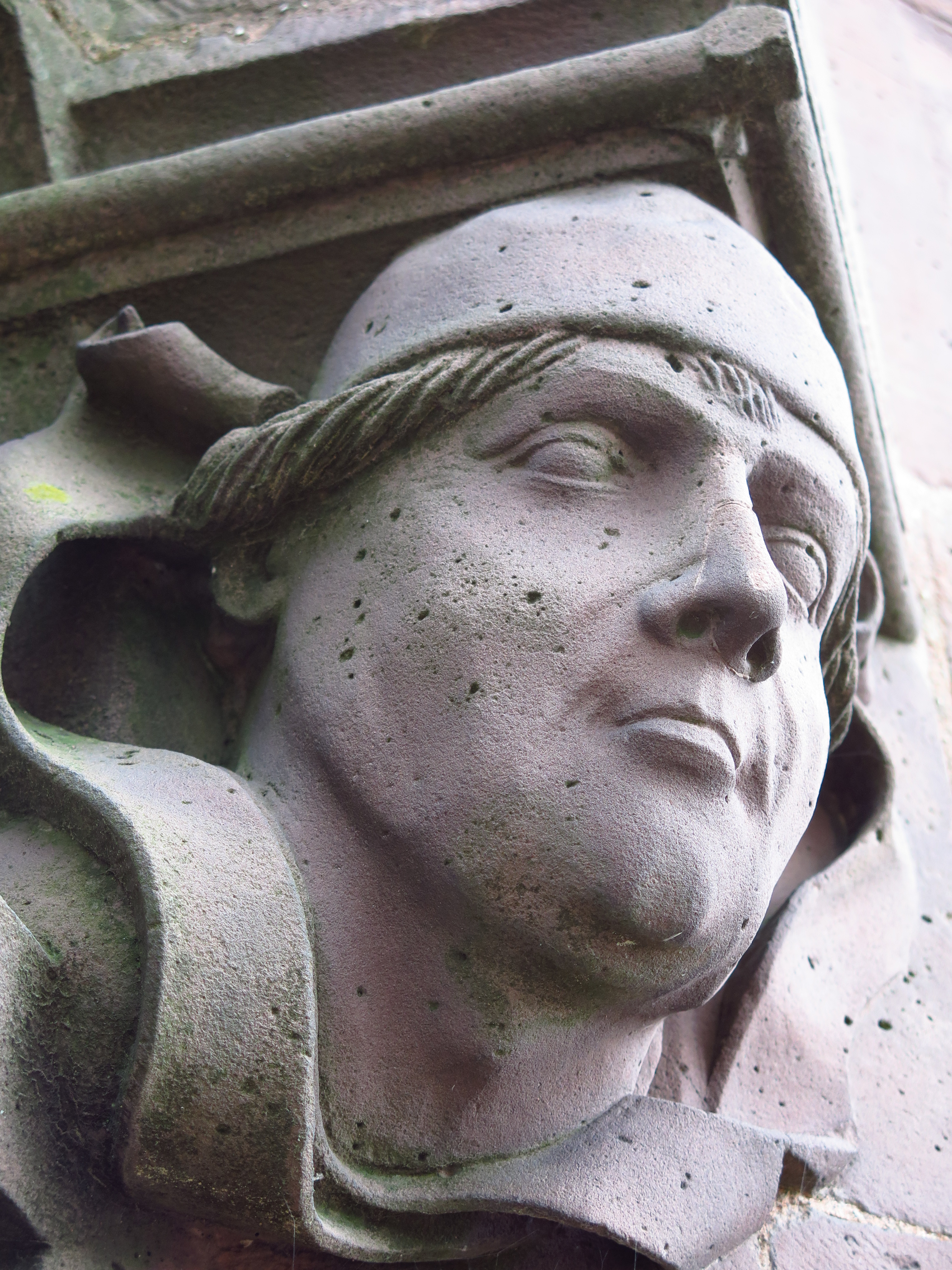
The bust of Hans Nussdorf on the Martinstower

Hans Nussdorf was a late gothic architect known for having completed the Martins tower of the Basler Minster in 1500. He was also involved in the construction of the Bernese Munster and the St.Leonhards church in Basel.

== Early life and ==
Where Nussdorf was born is not known, but it is assumed he hailed from Nussdorf at the Lake Constance. A Hannsen von Constentz or Hans von Constanz was mentioned in 1455 to have constructed the Monkey's Fountain. A certain "Hannsenn of Constantz, the new foreman" received some money It is assumed that Nussdorf (then called Johannes de Constancia) began to work at the Minster in 1467 in a leading position. Since 1472 he was mentioned as Hans Nussdorf.

== Professional career ==
He was admitted to the Spinnwetternzunft, (the stonemason trade union of Basel) in 1479. Onwards he was called master and in the 1480s, Nussdorf had his own mason workshop. According to the local guidelines, a master was allowed to take in only one apprentice.

=== Basler minster ===
Nussdorf is mainly known as the architect who finalized the works at the Martins tower of the Basler Minster. The towers construction was initiated in the 12th century, but had to undergo renovation after the 1356 earthquake in Basel. That the Martinstower was to rise more, was assumingly only decided in 1414. It was the year that a mason from Strassburg arrived in Basel to assess the towers fundaments for an eventual further rise of the tower. In 1470 another mason inspected the fundaments of the tower who also approved a further rise of the tower.

=== Martins tower ===
In 1488, Nussdorf presented his plans for the completion of the Martins tower to the city council which approved them. The construction of the tower begun in 1489, the year is marked in stone. In 1496 and before the last stage of the completion of the tower, several other master masons were invited to give their approval on the towers fundaments. They approved and on the 23 July 1500, its construction was completed with the addition of the finial on the top.

==== Works ====
On the Martinstower there is a bust of about 40 cm, which is strongly assumed to depict Nussdorf. Beside's the bust, on the same working block of sandstone from Wiesental there is a masons sign to be seen. He wears a leather cap under which some locks of hair are to be seen. The bust is hewn out of high quality stone and is located at the north-face of the tower, which is less affected by the weather. According to the appointments of the Minster masonry, he worked also on the ceiling of the small cloister and the surrounding walls of the large cloister.

==== Master mason ====
As the master mason of the Minster, he was one of the best earning craftsman in Basel. Master masons were only hired or promoted for larger projects such as the Martins tower. The master mason also had his personal workbench in the masonry of the Minster. After some remarkable accomplishments, he would be awarded some presents such as a considerable amount of wine or cereals.

=== Other works ===
Nussdorf had also been contracted to work on a church in Delémont in 1481, but was accused of not fulfilling the contract in 1485. He defended himself by arguing he had an overload of work as also in 1481, he had been hired to be the master mason of the Leonhards church. He doesn't appear to have worked on both of the churches and in the case of the Leonhards church he was replaced by the Austrian Hans Niessenberger in 1491. Niessendorf then accused Nussdorf of having insulted him which lead to a trial before court. Niessenberger wasn't able to finish his work at the Leonhards church and seemed to have died by 1493. In 1496 Nussdorf returned to the Leonhard church under a detailed contract in which he was assured not to be held responsible for the eventual mistakes of his predecessors. But the scholarship doesn't view Nussdorf as the main architect of the Leonhards church, as a considerable amount of its construction was done after Nussdorfs death in 1503.

Nussdorf was closely related with the masons guild of Strassburg, which in 1497 held their reunion in Basel explicitly "due to its famous master".

== Personal life ==
Nussdorf had to sons, Hans and Friedrich, who both also became stonemasons. Hans left Basel and became involved in the construction of the Minster of Bern, while Friedrich stayed in Basel and built the baptismal font for the St.Peters church. He had a brother Peter, with who he had a legal dispute over the care of their mother. Peter demanded Hans to fulfill his duties in taking care of her as agreed, and the court ordered Hans Nussdorf to do so. After his death in 1503, his estate was divided into one third to his wife and two thirds for his children. Between 1475 and 1480 he was provided with a place to live in the Augustines Alley, in a house owned by the Minsterworkshop. In 1480 he bought the House Sonnenberg in the White Alley. He also bought a wineyard near the Aeschen Square in 1490, but it didn't appear in the inventory of the testament. In the tax registers between 1475 and 1481 Nussdorf appears as a man without any wealth to tax which is suggested to be because the special treatment the masons working at the Minster received.
