= Hans Niessenberger =

German architect

Hans Niessenberger was an architect of the latter part of the Middle Ages.

== Life ==
Niessenberger's name is mentioned with comparative frequency in contemporaneous literature, but information about his personality and his works is somewhat more difficult to find. It seems however, that he was born in Graz, Styria. He worked on the choir of the Freiburg Minster from 1471 to 1480; in the latter year he was compelled to leave the task of building and to swear that he would not try to revenge himself for this. The choir at Freiburg was turned over to him in 1471; the contract is interesting and instructive showing as it does the manner in which buildings of this kind were erected during the latter part of the Middle Ages, and how the working hours, wages, etc. were determined upon. The choir possesses great beauty, but it also manifests the peculiarities of Late Gothic architecture. It is long, like the main church, with the nave higher, the side aisles lower and somewhat narrower than in the front, and surrounded by twelve chapels, enclosed on two sides by fluted columns. The arched roof, supported by beautifully carved columns, forms a network. The windows are characteristically Late Gothic, and the arches are wonderfully delicate. In 1482, He worked on the Strasbourg Cathedral; and in the following year he probably was engaged on the Milan Cathedral with a yearly salary of 180 guilders. In 1491, he replaced the local master mason Hans Nussdorf at the Leonhards church. The two had a disagreement after his predecessor Nussdorf appeared to have insulted him and he had to leave Basel. He had to face other accusations from Freiburg, who deemed his works as insufficient. Following, he was dismissed and shortly arrested. He appeared to have died in 1493.
