= Max Sulzbachner =

Max Sulzbachner (1904–1985) was a Swiss painter, graphic artist, illustrator, stage designer and mask maker. He was a proponent of Swiss Expressionism, an offshoot of German Expressionism. He co-founded the artist group Red-Blue II and the Group 33, a 1933 anti-fascist coalition of Basel artists in protest against the conservative tendencies of the Swiss artist and architect scene, and was a lantern painter for the Basler Fasnacht, the biggest carnival in Switzerland.
