= Ulrich Ensingen =

German architect

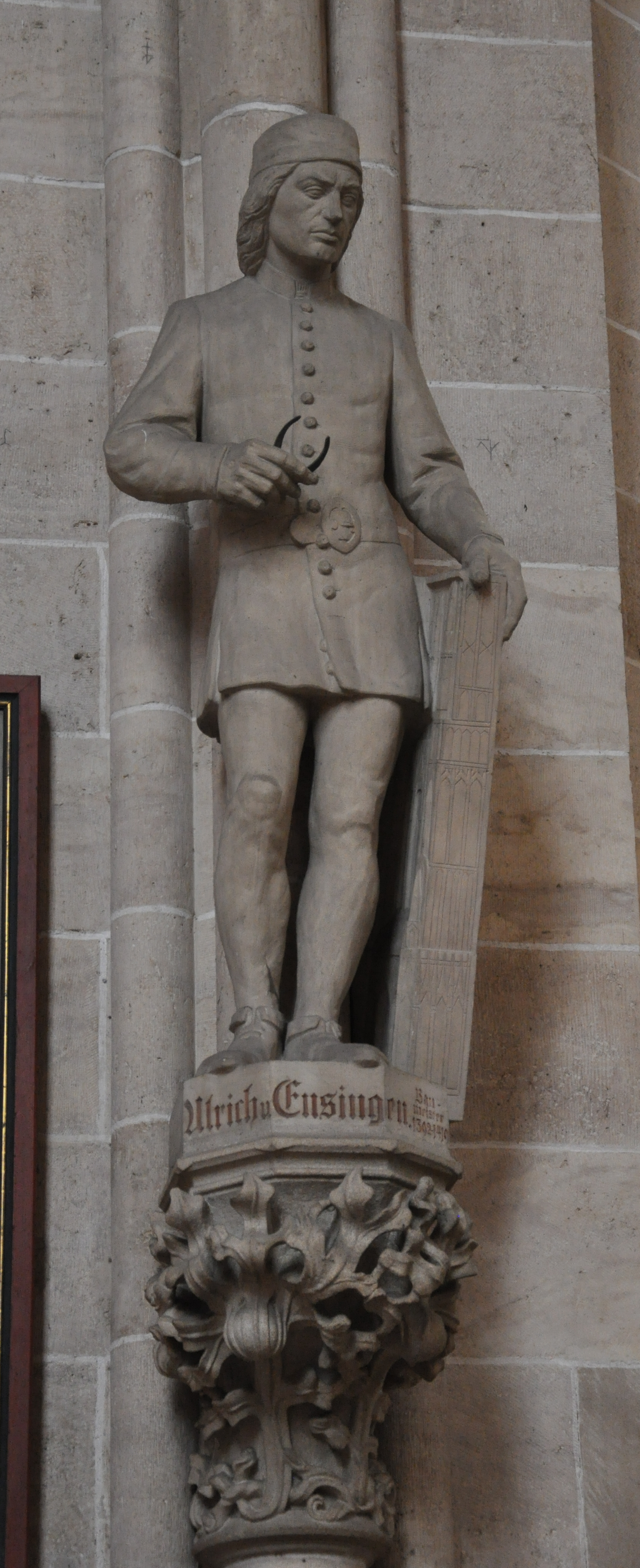
Ulm Münster Statue Ulrich von Ensingen

Ulrich Ensingen (or Ensinger; died 10 February 1419) was a medieval German architect. He conceived the plans for the main spire of the Ulm Minster (the tallest church tower in existence); designing the Sondergotik tower, and the west porch, though the upper stages were built by Böblinger. He was also the architect of the elegant octagonal stage of the tower at Strasbourg Cathedral, France, with its cage of intricate tracery.

Later in his life, he worked at the Frauenkirche, Esslingen (from 1398), and the convent at Pforzheim (from 1409). He, or his son, also Ulrich, appears to have acted as a consultant at Milan Cathedral in 1394.
