= Otto Abt =

Swiss painter

Otto Hans Abt
- Born: June 9, 1903; Binningen, Switzerland
- Died: October 1, 1982 (aged 79); Basel, Switzerland
- Education: University of Basel; Trade school in Basel
- Known for: Painting
- Notable work: "Vor Sonnenaufgang" (Ceramic), "Aurore" (Painting), "Komposition" (Mural), "Jahreszeiten" (Stained Glass), "Vorort im Winter" (Painting)
- Movement: Surrealism, Abstract art

Otto Hans Abt (June 9, 1903 – October 1, 1982) was a Swiss surrealist and abstract painter.

== Life ==
Otto Abt was born in 1903 in Binningen in the Canton of Basel-Country in Switzerland. He was the son of a doctor, he studied medicine at the University of Basel but broke off his study after two years and focused on his training as a painter at the trade school in Basel. There he came to know the painter Walter Kurt Wiemken and Walter Bodmer, with whom he maintained a lifelong friendship. There followed, starting in 1927, a series of trips to Spain and southern France among other places as well as studying abroad in Paris, where he came into contact with Parisian avant-garde painting. Through an examination of the works of Matisse, Picasso, and Dalí as well as his friendship with surrealist painter Serge Brignoni, he developed his own surrealist-influenced painting style.

In an effort to gain recognition for the modern, abstract-concrete and surrealist painting in Switzerland, Abt and several other painters from Basel founded the anti-fascist "Gruppe 33" (Group 33). In 1936, he joined the alliance, a group of modern Swiss artists who campaigned for the propagation of non-representational art. Abt spent the war years in Tessin.

Since the 1950s, Abt undertook a variety of artistic projects: in addition to canvas painting, murals and stained glass for public buildings, as well as Maiolica ceramics, and mosaics. He also took part, along with other artists of the Gruppe 33, in the development and production of the "Basler Kunstlarven" (Basel Artistic Masks), highly decorated masks used in the Carnival of Basel. He is buried in a cemetery in Basel.

== Works ==
Abt's rejection of fascism and his tendency toward social criticism are reflected in many of his works. While his early works were marked by impressionist influences and even tonal painting, he developed his own surrealist-influenced style that can be recognized by object alienation and fantastic picture elements. In his later years he returned to landscape scenes and still lifes. His work has been shown in numerous galleries, primarily in Switzerland.

Selected works

- Vor Sonnenaufgang (Ceramic), 1934, Fountain decoration, Petersschule, Basel
- Aurore (Painting), 1935, Kunstmuseum Basel
- Komposition (Mural), 1968, Spiegelfeld-Schule, Binningen
- Jahreszeiten (Stained Glass), 1974–76, Crematory of the Graveyard at Hörnli in Riehen
- Vorort im Winter (painting), 1969,
