= Beatrice Afflerbach =

Swiss graphic designer

- Born: June 14, 1920; Basel, Basel-Stadt, Switzerland
- Died: March 3, 2003 (aged 82); Binningen, Basel-Landschaft, Switzerland
- Other name: Beatrice Afflerbach-Hefti
- Education: Kunstgewerbeschule Basel
- Spouse: Ferdinand ″Ferdi″ Afflerbach

Beatrice "Bea" Afflerbach (14 June 1920 – 3 March 2003) was a Swiss graphic designer, painter, drafter and illustrator.

== Life and work ==
Afflerbach studied at the Kunstgewerbeschule Basel (now, Schule für Gestaltung Basel) and in 1941 was the first woman to graduate from the institution with a diploma in graphic design. After her studies she founded an office together with Sita Jucker and her later husband Ferdinand "Ferdi" Afflerbach in 1942, where commercially successful graphics were created.

Afflerbach-Hefti was involved in the women's rights movement. In 1957, she was one of the founding members of the Soroptimist International Club Basel, a club of working women that supports charitable projects worldwide. She designed posters campaigning for women's voting rights (women did not gain the right to vote in Switzerland until 1971). She took part in the Schweizerischen Ausstellung für Frauenarbeit (Swiss exhibition for women's work) in 1958.

The estate of the couple are held in the archives of the Schule für Gestaltung Basel.

== Worksamples ==
- Maria Aebersold: Reserfiert für Basler. Illustrationen von Beatrice Afflerbach. Pharos, Basel 1961, DNB 363268375.
- Hanni Salfinger: Das Flügelkleid. Bettinger Märchenbuch. Illustrationen von Beatrice Afflerbach. Schudel, Riehen 1972, ISBN 978-3-85895-722-1.
- Elisabeth Klein: Die Entstehung der Welt und der Gestirne. Indianische und andere Sagen. Mit einem mehrfarbigen Poster von Beatrice Afflerbach. Novalis, Schaffhausen 1976, ISBN 978-3-7214-7003-1.
- Miggeli Aebersold: S’ Honorar und anderi baseldytschi Gschichte. Illustrationen von Beatrice Afflerbach. Pharos, Basel 1977, ISBN 978-3-7230-0083-0.

== Literature ==
- Eberhard Hölscher: Ferdi und Beatrice Afflerbach. In: Gebrauchsgraphik. Jahrgang 25, Heft 2, 1954, S. 26–33 (online).
- Julia Meer: Afflerbach, Beatrice. Kurzbiografie. In: Gerda Breuer, Julia Meer (Hrsg.): Women in Graphic Design 1890–2012. Jovis, Berlin 2012, ISBN 978-3-86859-153-8, S. 395.
