= Johann Jakob Ulrich =

Swiss painter and graphic artist (1798–1877)

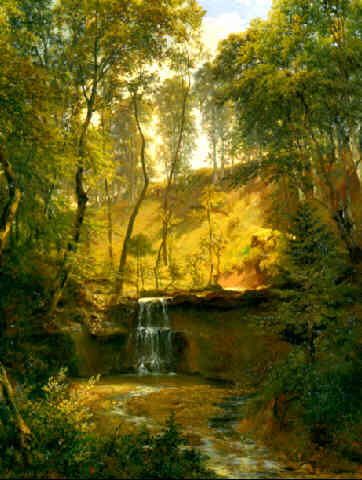
Woodland Stream in the Sunshine

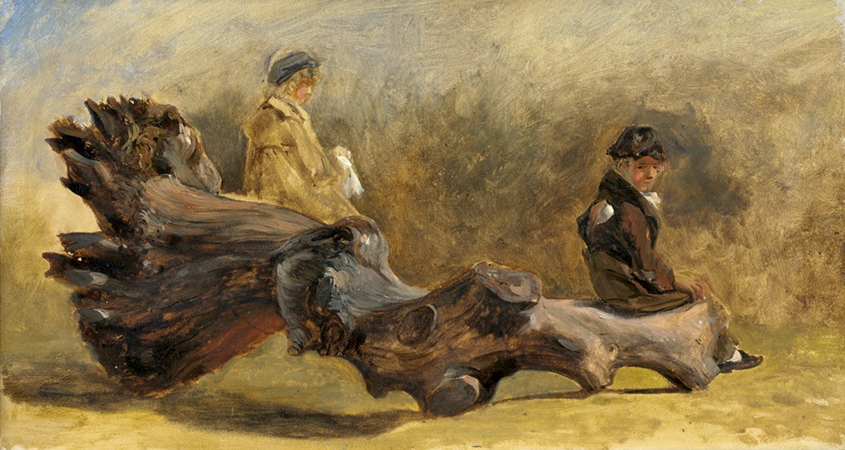
Tree Trunk with Two Children

Johann Jakob Ulrich (28 February 1798 – 17 March 1877) was a Swiss painter and graphic artist. He is primarily known for landscapes, although he did some figure paintings and still-lifes.

== Biography ==
He was born in Andelfingen. His father, Johann Jakob Ulrich-Meyer (1769–1840), was a Cantonal clerk who later became a publisher. Due to the dangerous situation in the border region with France, he was sent to live with his grandparents in Weisslingen. Later, he attended schools in Winterthur and Zürich. Upon his father's advice, he initially trained to be a merchant, although he had already expressed a strong interest in art and was copying paintings. In 1816, after the troubles in France had concluded, he began working the banking firm Paturle, Lepin & Cie in Paris

He remained at the bank until 1823 but, in 1822, unable to ignore his true desires any longer, he started to frequent the studios of Jean-Victor Bertin, alongside Camille Corot. He also studied with Xavier Leprince and his brothers. Later he worked with Théodore Gudin in Dieppe and, in 1825, opened his own studio in Paris. From the Salon of 1824, he was a regular exhibitor at the Salon.

Between 1828 and 1830, with the support of the well-known penal reformer, Frédéric-Auguste Demetz (who was also an avid art collector), he travelled throughout Italy and visited England several times from 1832 to 1835, where he was influenced by the works of John Constable. In the late 1830s, he settled in Zürich, although he continued to travel extensively. For a time, he shared a studio with his friend, the animal painter, Jacques Raymond Brascassat. In 1837, he married Dorothea Susanne von Schwerzenbach, from an old Zürich family.

By the mid 1840s, he was taking students, notably Rudolf Koller. Later, he began catering to the popular tastes in subject matter, but retained his personal style, expressed by lighting effects. He became a professor of landscape painting at the Eidgenössische Polytechnikum in 1855. The following year his wife died and he married her sister, Bertha. This began a period of almost nonstop travelling and, combined with eyesight problems, occasioned a decline in the quality of his work. After Bertha's death in 1874, he retired from public life. He died in 1877 in Zürich.
