= Johann Gottfried Steffan =

Swiss painter

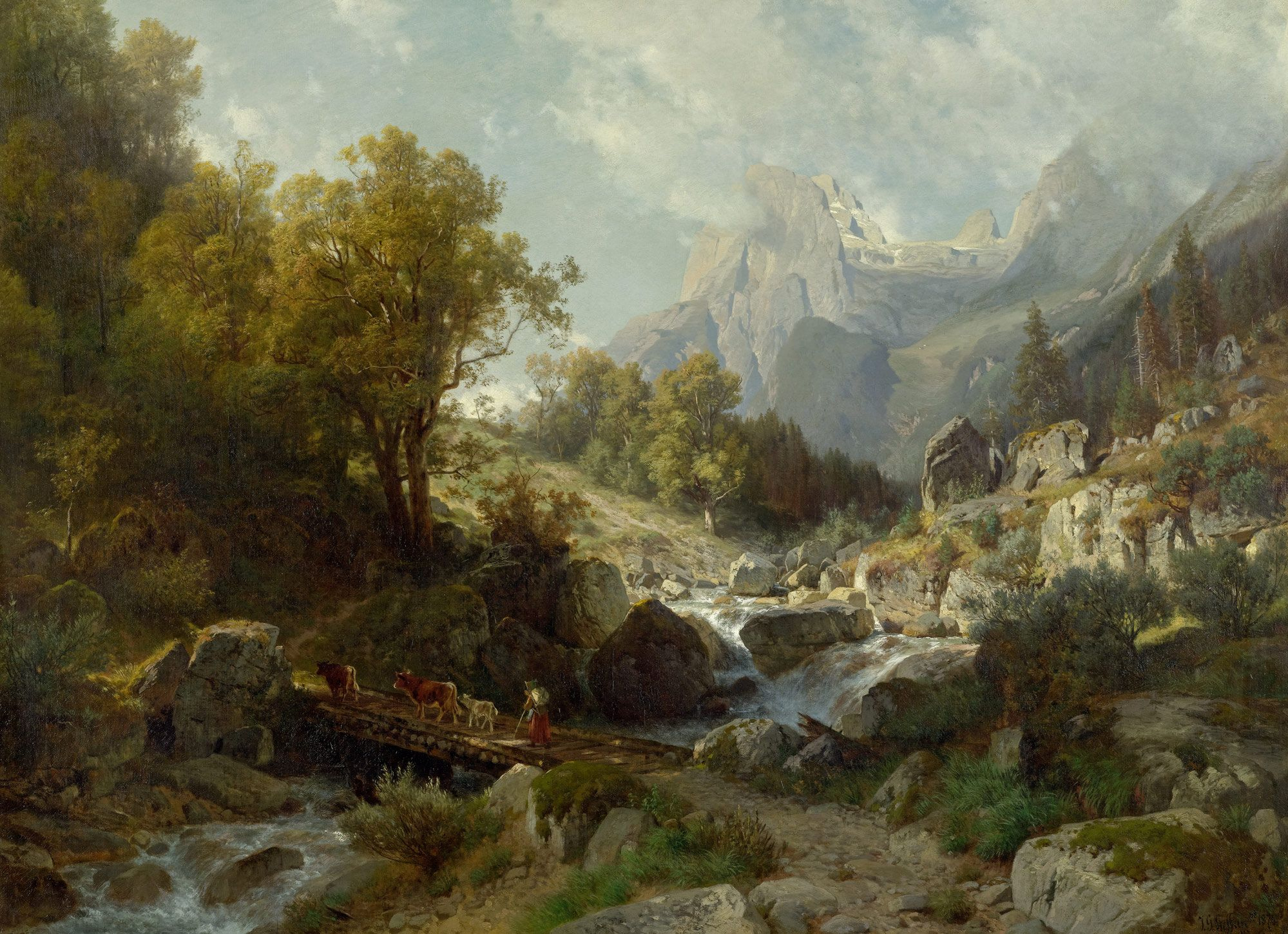
Motiv aus der Ramsau bei Berchtesgaden, 1874

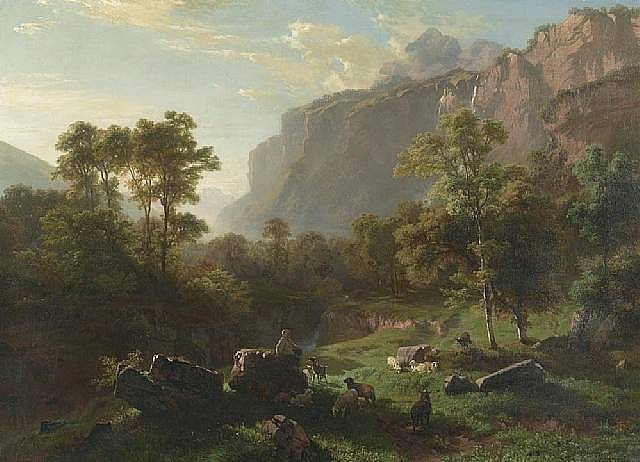
Young herdsman with goats and sheep, 1858

Johann Gottfried Steffan (December 13, 1815 – June 16, 1905) was a Swiss landscape artist, regarded as one of the most important Swiss landscapists of the 19th century.

Steffan was born in Wädenswil, Switzerland in 1815. After his apprenticeship as a lithographer in his home town, Steffan travelled to Munich in 1833, where he attended the Academy of Fine Arts under Peter von Cornelius. Under the influence of Carl Rottmann, he turned to realistic landscape art. Steffan's studio became the center for Swiss artists in Munich, including Rudolf Koller, Johann Caspar Bosshardt and Arnold Böcklin, although he was also associated with artists from Germany. His pupils include Traugott Schiess (1834–69) and Otto Frölicher.

He made several study trips to the Swiss Alps, especially to the Canton of Glarus and to Lake Walen. Later, he often went to Berchtesgaden and to Ramsau where he found many of his motifs. Steffan's paintings mostly are idealistic landscapes of the Munich School and often show mountain motifs. Koller compared his style to Alexandre Calame. Franz Zelger, in his entry in Grove Art Online, describes him as an "outstanding and sensitive observer of nature" although notes "his manner was often slick and conventional".

His son Arnold Steffan (1848–82) was also a landscape artist. Johann Gottfried Steffan died on June 16, 1905, in Munich.

== Main works ==
- Mittag in den Glarner Alpen, Bergbach ("Noon in the Alps of Glarus, Mountain Stream", 1857), House of Art, Aarau
- Der Mont d'Orge bei Sitten ("Mont d'Orge by Sitten", 1869), Museum of Art, Luzern
- Landscape Study at Lake Starnberg (1872), Zurich, Ksthaus
- Alp im Klöntal ("Alp in the Kloen Valley", 1880), House of Art, Glarus
- Bergsee bei heranziehendem Gewitter ("Mountain Lake at a Gathering Thunderstorm", 1886), House of Art, Zurich
