= Rudolf Koller =

19th-century Swiss painter

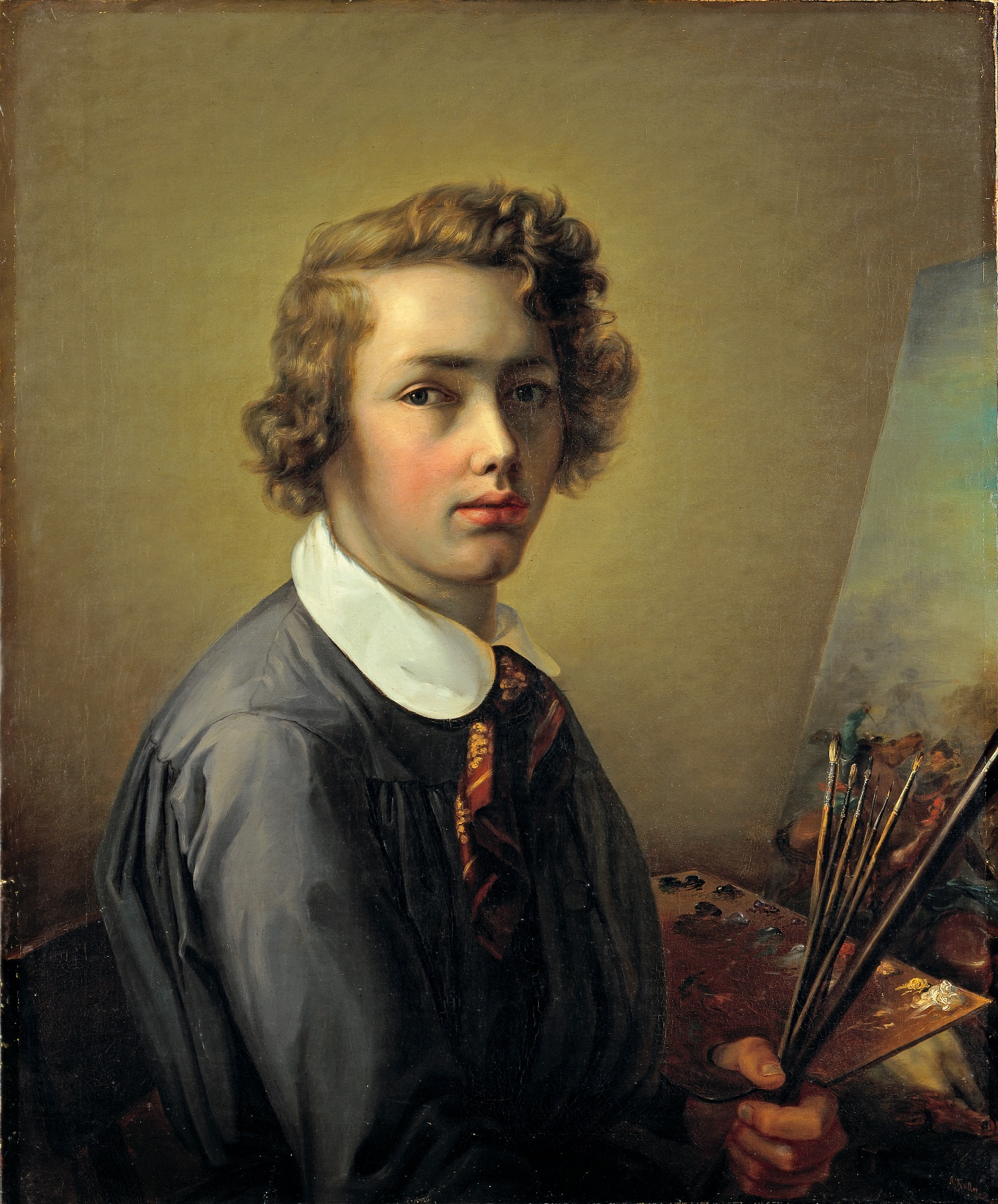
Rudolf Koller, 1844, self-portrait at 16

Rudolf Koller (21 May 1828 – 5 January 1905) was a Swiss painter. He is associated with a realist and classicist style, and also with the essentially romantic Düsseldorf school of painting. Koller's style is similar to that of the realist painters Gustave Courbet and Jean-Baptiste-Camille Corot. Considered Switzerland's finest animal painter, Koller is rated alongside George Stubbs, Rosa Bonheur and Théodore Géricault. While his reputation was based on his paintings of animals, he was a sensitive and innovative artist whose well-composed works in the "plein air" tradition, including Swiss mountain landscapes, are just as finely executed.

He has been described as "the painter of the Swiss national animal", because of his paintings of cows in Swiss landscapes. He is considered, along with Frank Buchser and Gustave Eugène Castan, to be one of the most important Swiss painters of the 19th century. The Gotthardpost, or The St Gotthard Mailcoach, is one of his most famous paintings. It depicts a mail coach, drawn by white horses, speeding along a mountain road.

== Life ==
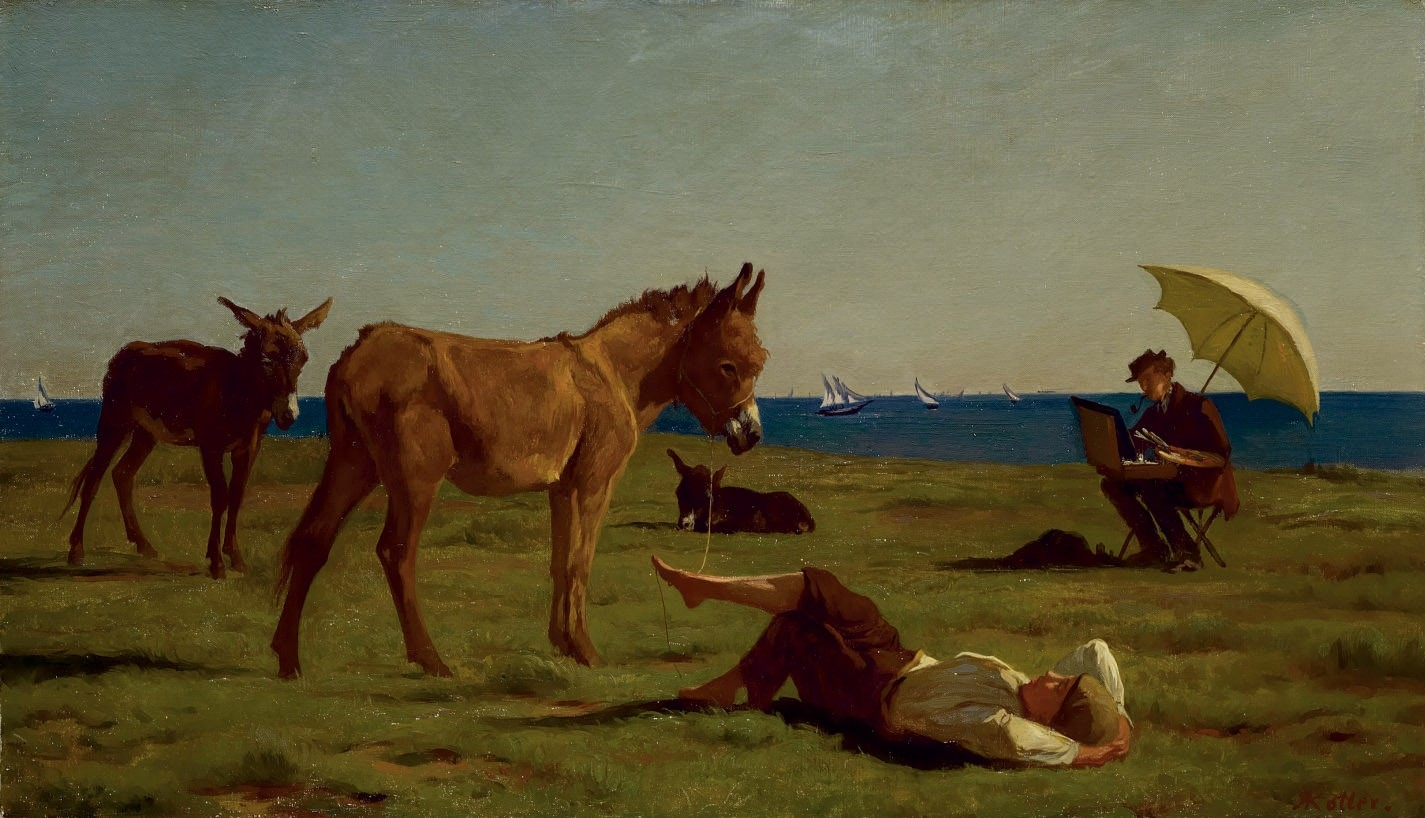
The Artist and his Model, 1854

Koller was born in Zürich in 1828. In 1830 his father, Johann Heinrich, was a butcher and brewer, who became the innkeeper at the "Schwarzen Adler" hotel, in the centre of the city near the river. His mother was Maria Ursula née Forster. As the clientele were mostly waggoners and cattle dealers, Koller saw horses and cattle on a daily basis. He started his education at a private school; later he attended an elementary school called Fraumünster.

From 1840 to 1843 he studied at the cantonal industrial school in Zürich. He got his first artistic tuition from his uncle, who was a landscape painter. The young Koller decided to specialise as a painter in depicting horses.

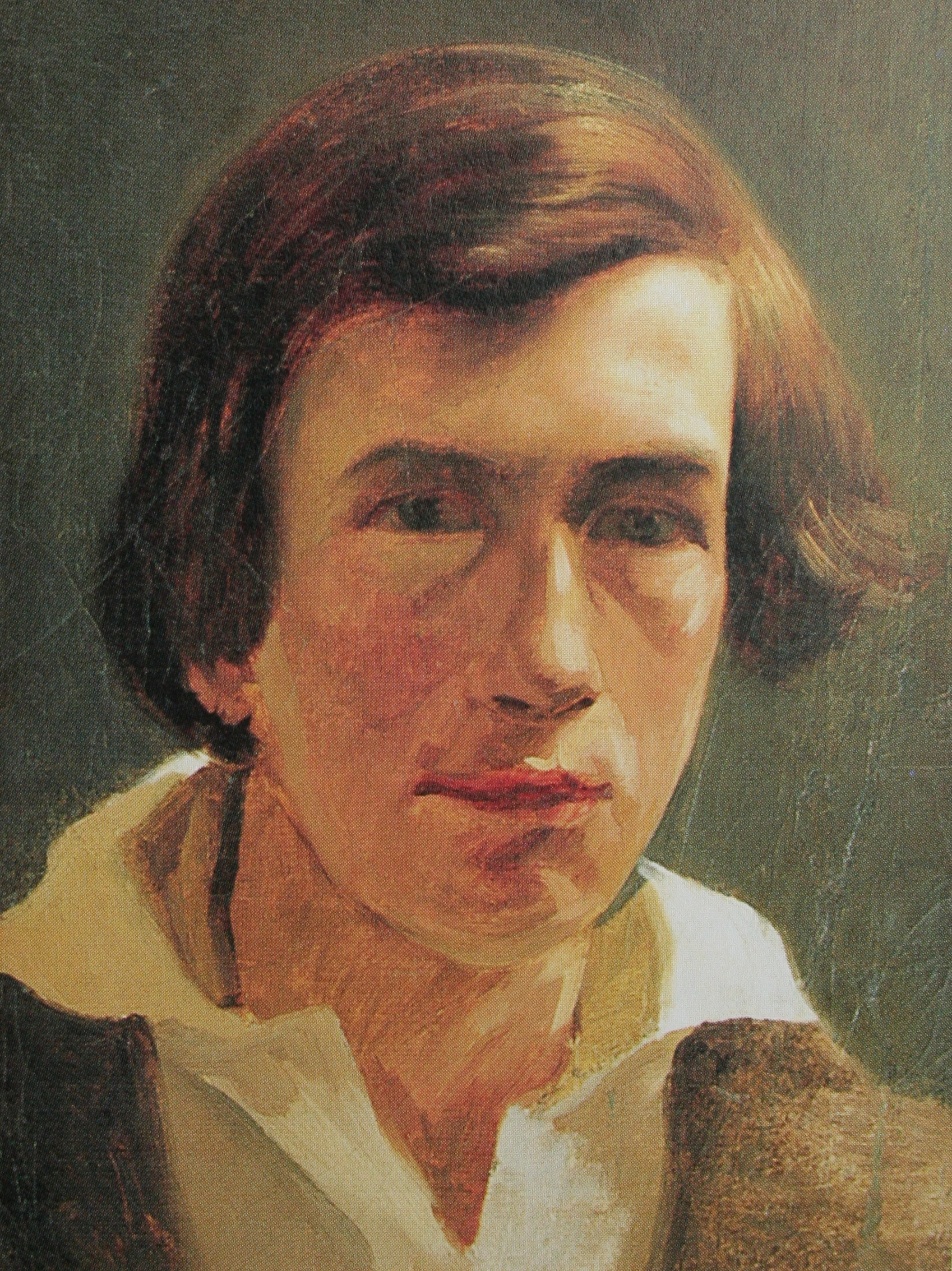
Koller's portrait of the young Arnold Böcklin, 1847

After he left the Industrial School in Zurich, in October 1843, Koller began studying under the art teacher Jacques Schweizer, the portrait painter Johann Rudolf Obrist, and the landscape painter Johann Jakob Ulrich, and took private painting classes with them. Ulrich, who was a successful painter of landscapes and animals, influenced him further in his choice of themes during his artistic career.

In 1845 he went to Munich where he worked with a group of artists called "the Schweizer", led by the Swiss landscapist Johann Gottfried Steffan.

In 1845 horse trials were begun at the stud farm of the King of Württemberg, near Stuttgart, and Koller was hired to produce pictures of horses and dogs there. In 1846–47, he studied figure drawing under Karl Ferdinand Sohn at the Fine Arts Academy of Düsseldorf. At the Academy Koller formed friendships with the future Swiss symbolist painter Arnold Böcklin and the German classicist Anselm Feuerbach. Rudolf Koller travelled together with his friend Arnold Böcklin to Brussels and Antwerp, in 1847.

== Career ==
Later Koller moved to Paris. In 1847, while living in Paris, he shared a studio with Arnold Böcklin. At the Louvre he copied Netherlandish artworks of the 17th century and familiarized himself with the works of contemporary animal painters such as Rosa Bonheur and Constant Troyon. He also visited the studio of the animal painter Jacques Raymond Brascassat.

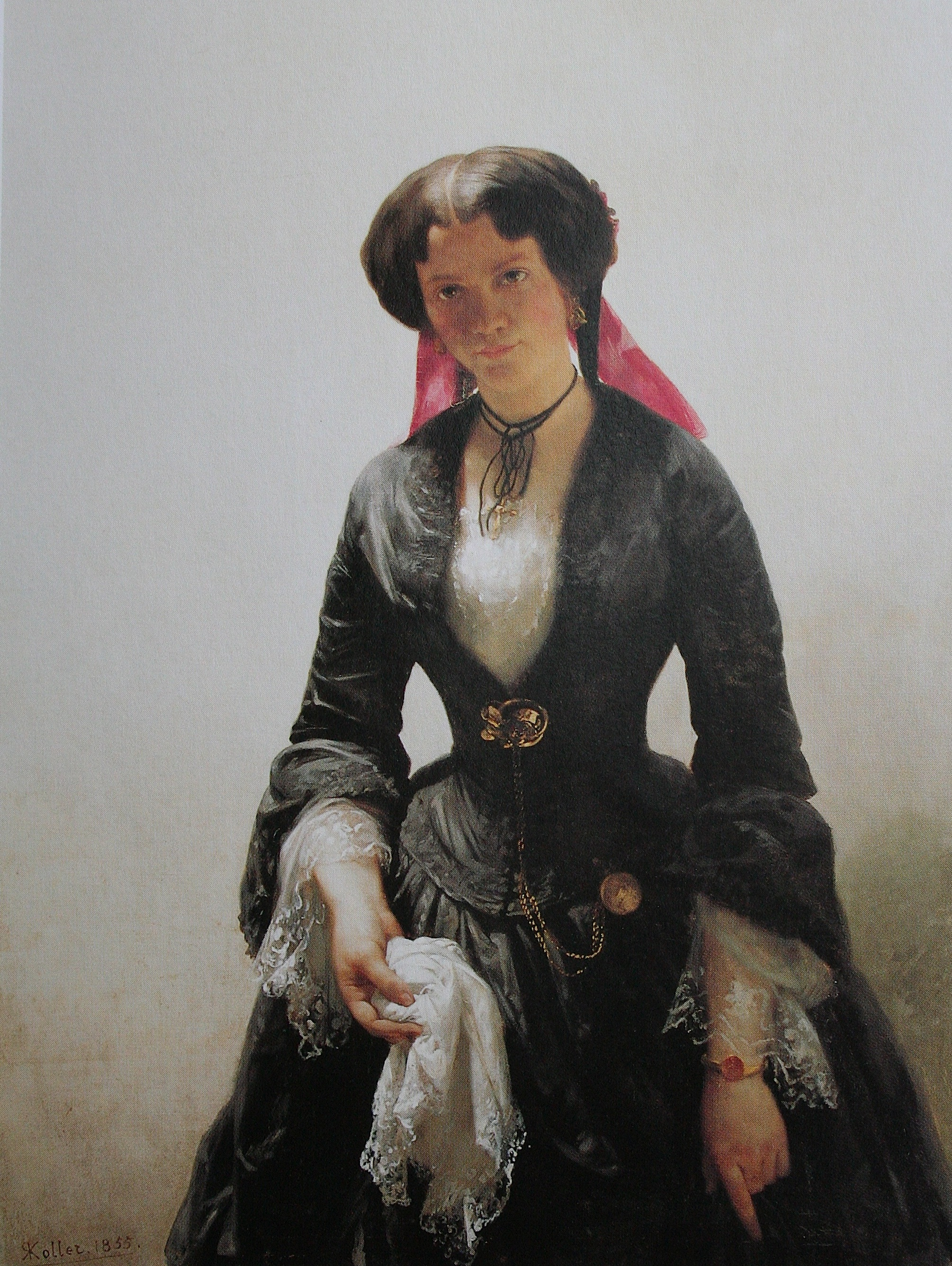
Koller's painting of Bertha Schlatter, 1855

With the support of the artists’ colony at Barbizon, Koller painted scenes in outdoor settings. In 1848, plagued by financial difficulties, he returned from France to Zürich.

From 1849 to 1850 Koller painted at Hasliberg, a village near Interlaken. Later he travelled to Munich, where he became acquainted with the landscape and animal painters Johann Gottfried Steffan and Friedrich Voltz. At a horse farm in Upper Bavaria he produced studies of horses and travelled to the Zugspitze and Tirol to study mountain scenery.

From April 1851 he again lived in Zürich, where he became friends with the Swiss painters Robert Zünd and Ernst Stückelberg. Koller opened a studio in Zürich, as a result of which he obtained numerous commissions for paintings of animals. In 1852–53, in association with Zünd, he painted several landscape studies near the Walensee, a large lake in eastern Switzerland.

In May 1856 Koller, aged 28, married Bertha Schlatter, whose portrait he had painted the year before. They went on their honeymoon to Vienna, where Koller's works had been exhibited several times.

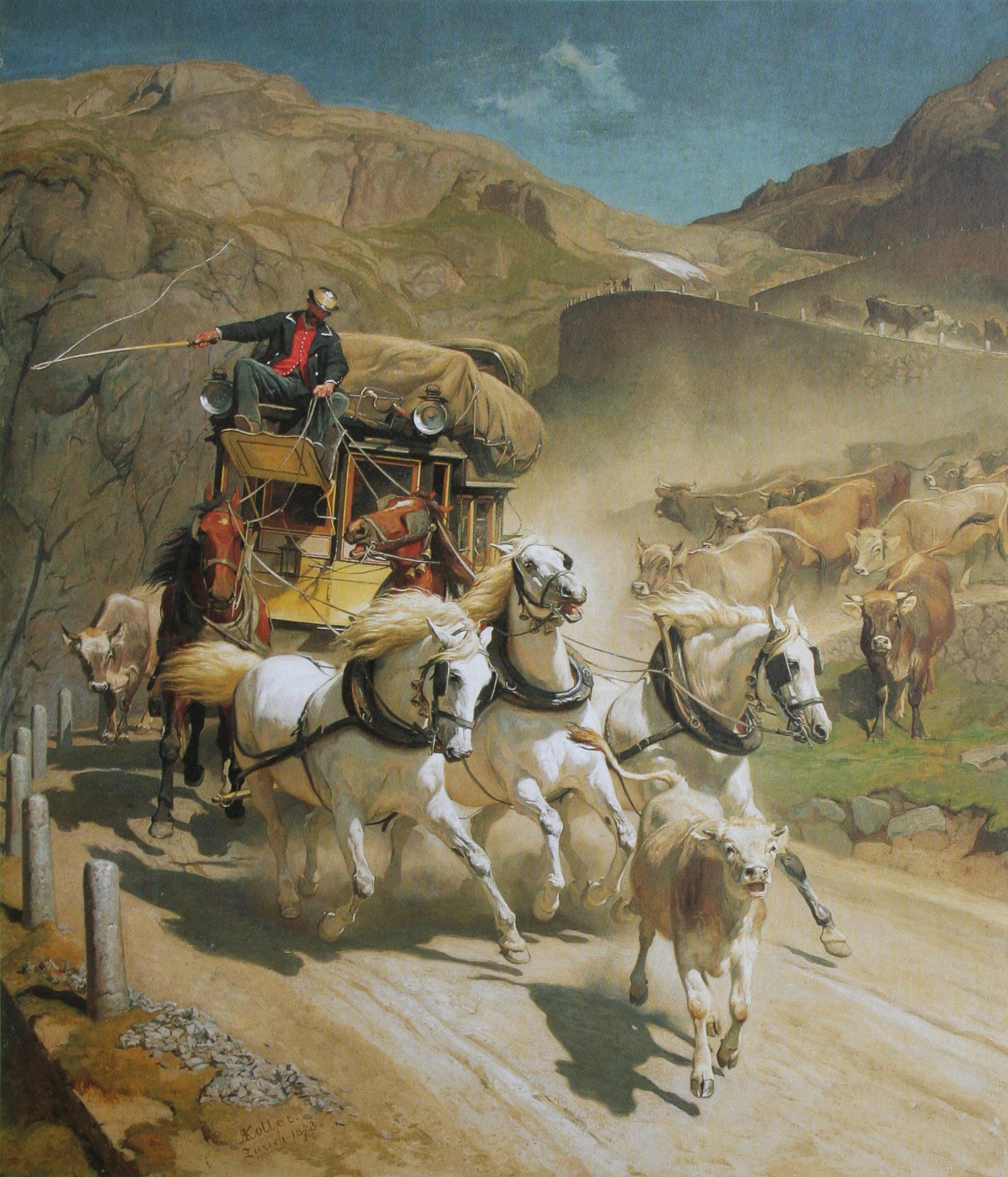
Gotthardpost, 1873

In 1857 he produced the notable painting Die Kuh im Krautgarten (Cow in the Vegetable Garden). He became friends with the Swiss Bildungsroman novelist Gottfried Keller, the cultural historian Jacob Burckhardt and the novelist and playwright Friedrich Theodor Vischer. During 1858, Koller travelled to the Swiss Canton of Glarus; his work Richisau dates from this trip.

In 1862 Koller bought a chalet on the eastern shore of Lake Zürich, where he was to live for the rest of his life. There he kept various animals, mainly to study them as painting subjects. He often painted rustic farm scenes, landscapes and scenes that depicted animals. He loved animals and treated them in his pictures as representing part of the forces of unspoiled nature. In 1868–69 his travels took him to Florence, Rome and Naples.

After he returned, he took in art students at his studio. His painting Hay Harvest in Threatening Weather of 1854 is a good example of his harmonious composition and integrity of expression.

In 1870 Koller began to suffer from a vision impairment that interfered with his work. Nevertheless, in 1873, still at the height of his artistic powers, he secured an assignment from the Swiss Northeastern Railway, to produce a gift for the industrial and railway pioneer Alfred Escher on the occasion of his retirement. Koller chose to allude to the St. Gotthard tunnel project, which Escher had championed, and eventually combined several studies to paint the Gotthardpost, or The Gotthard Mail Coach, showing one of the horse-drawn mail coaches, rendered obsolete by the opening of the tunnel. The painting is recognized as one of the best ever done by a Swiss painter. It now hangs in the Kunsthaus Zürich. Koller painted a replica in 1874 for the Credit Suisse bank in Zurich. In 1900 Koller travelled for the last time to Italy, where he met with his friend Böcklin near Florence.

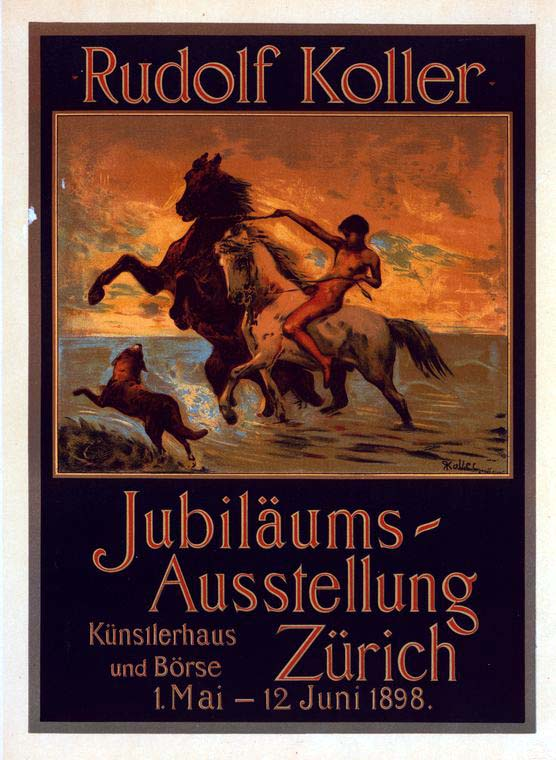
1898 Exhibition poster

== Death ==
Koller died in 1905, aged 76, at his chalet. His grave is in the Sihlfeld Cemetery in Zürich, near that of his friend Gottfried Keller (who had died in 1890).

After Koller's death, the Zürich Art Museum staged an exhibition of his works, including some from his earliest years, and various personal artefacts. To honour the 100th anniversary of his death the Hotel Adler fitted a "stand-up bar for dogs", consisting of cast-iron water troughs, to the outside wall of the hotel. The bar has a mechanism which refreshes the water every 30 minutes.

== Honours ==
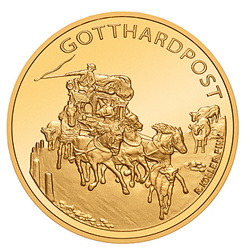
2013 coin

In 1898, in honour of Koller's 70th birthday, a large exhibition of his works was staged in Zürich, and drew 20,000 visitors. In the same year Koller was awarded an honorary doctorate by the University of Zürich.

Switzerland in 2013 issued a commemorative 50-franc coin bearing a likeness of Koller's most well-known work, Gotthard Post.

== Works ==
Rudolf Koller's animal paintings

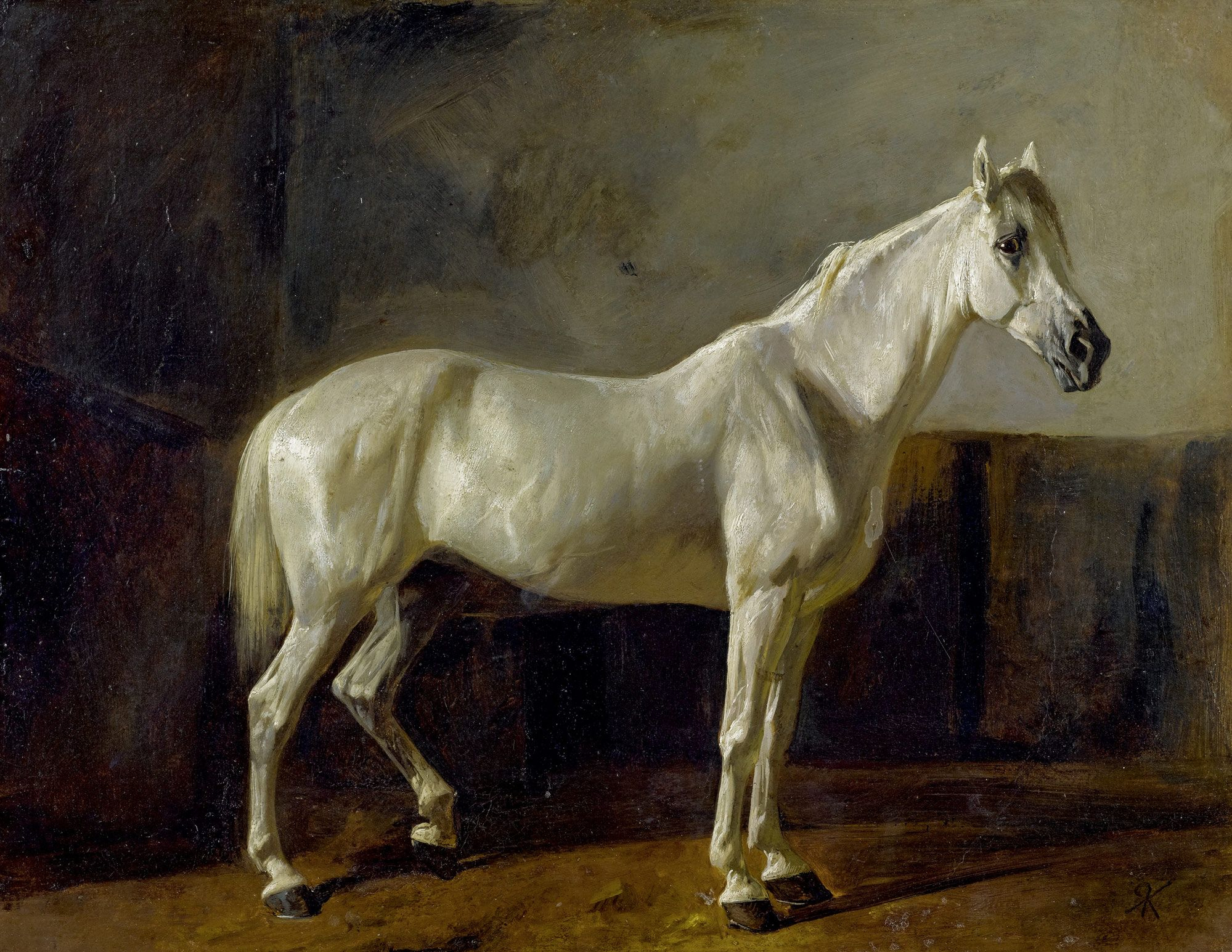
Standing White Horse

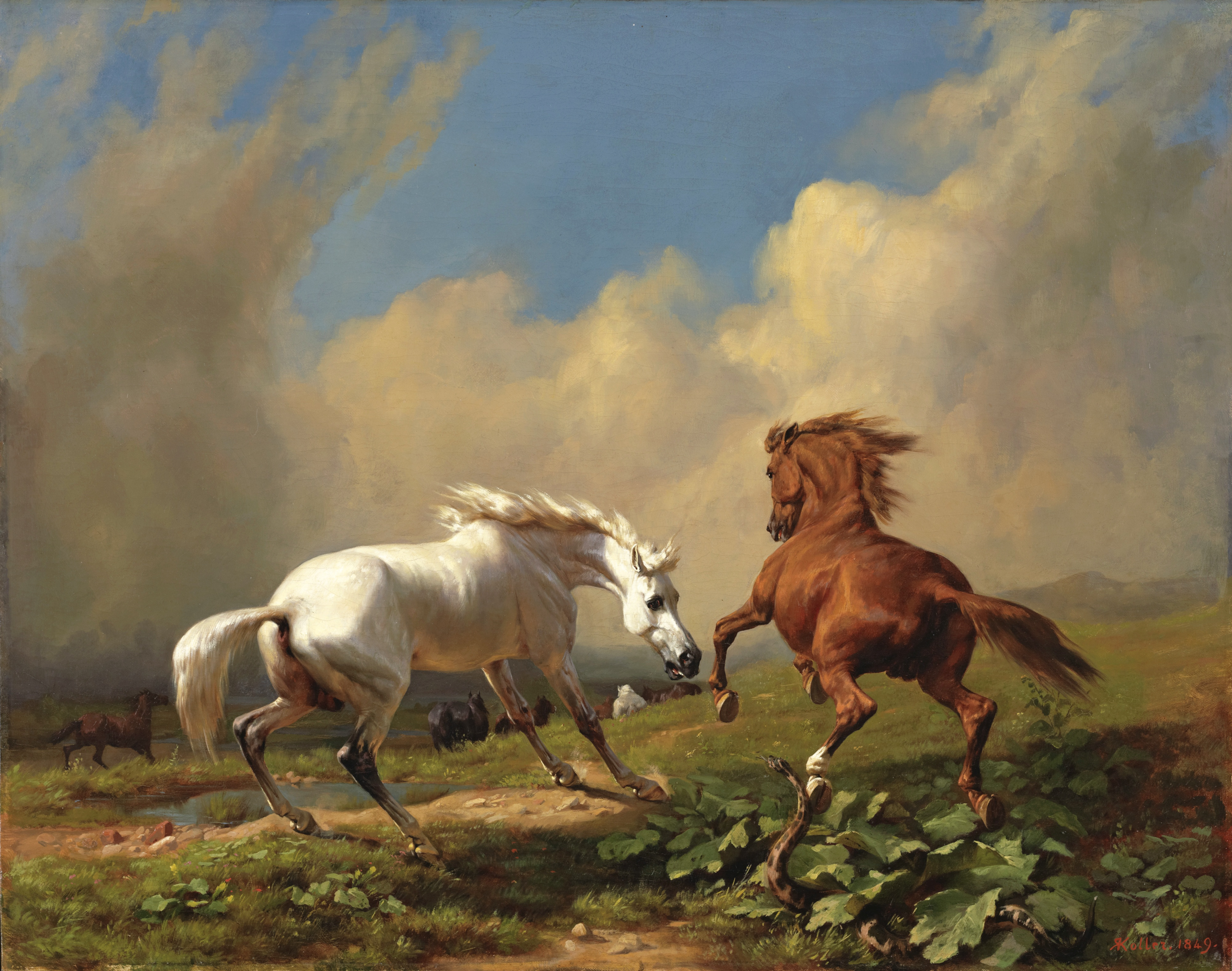
Frightened Horses Before a Storm, 1849

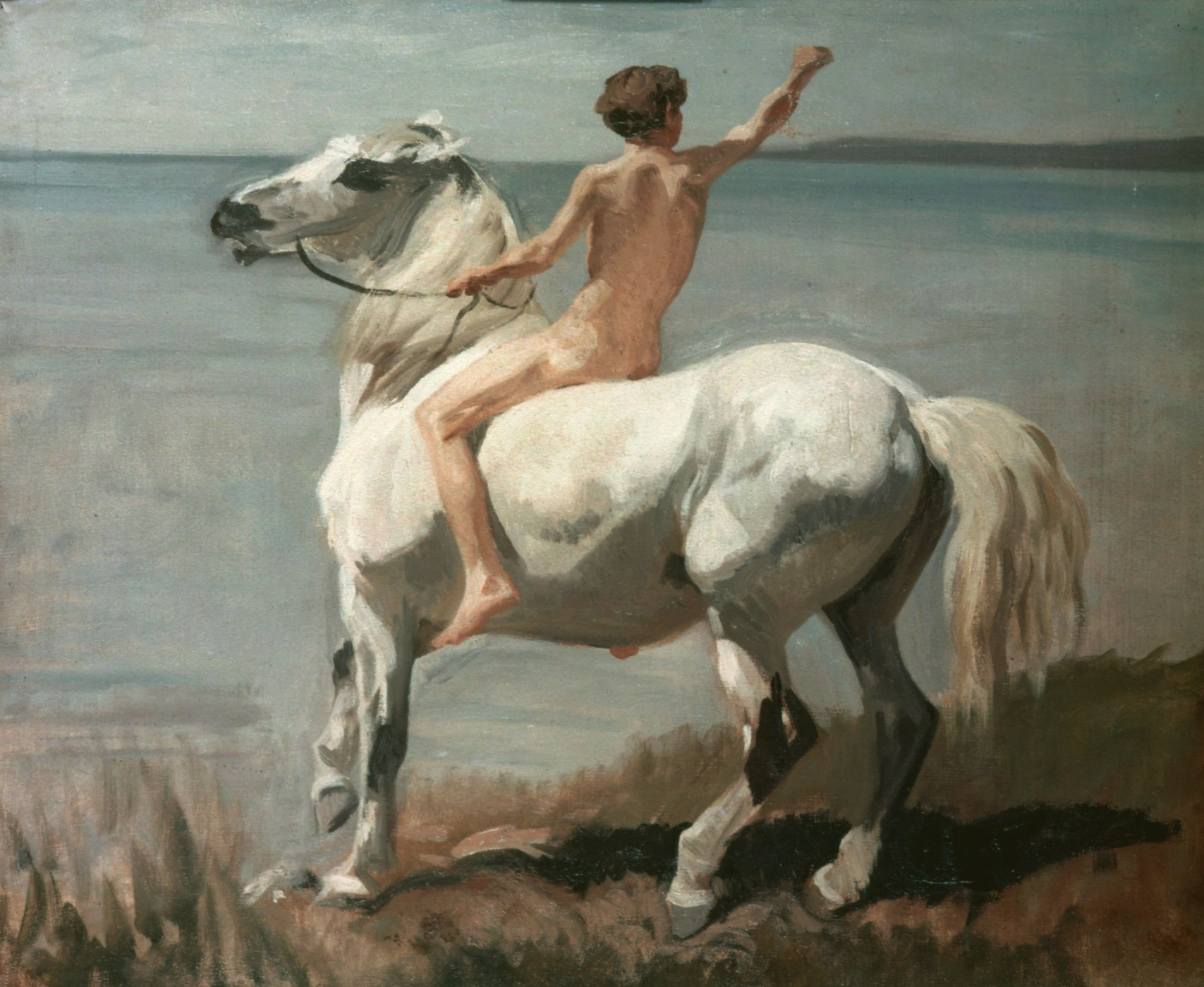
Boy on White Horse, 1872

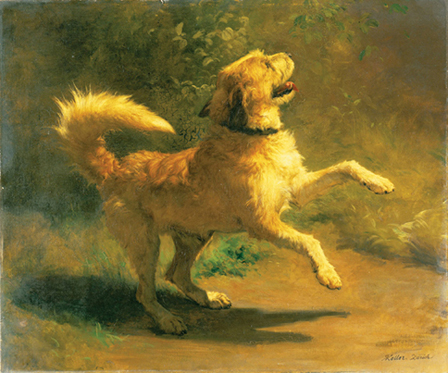
Jumping Dog, 1856

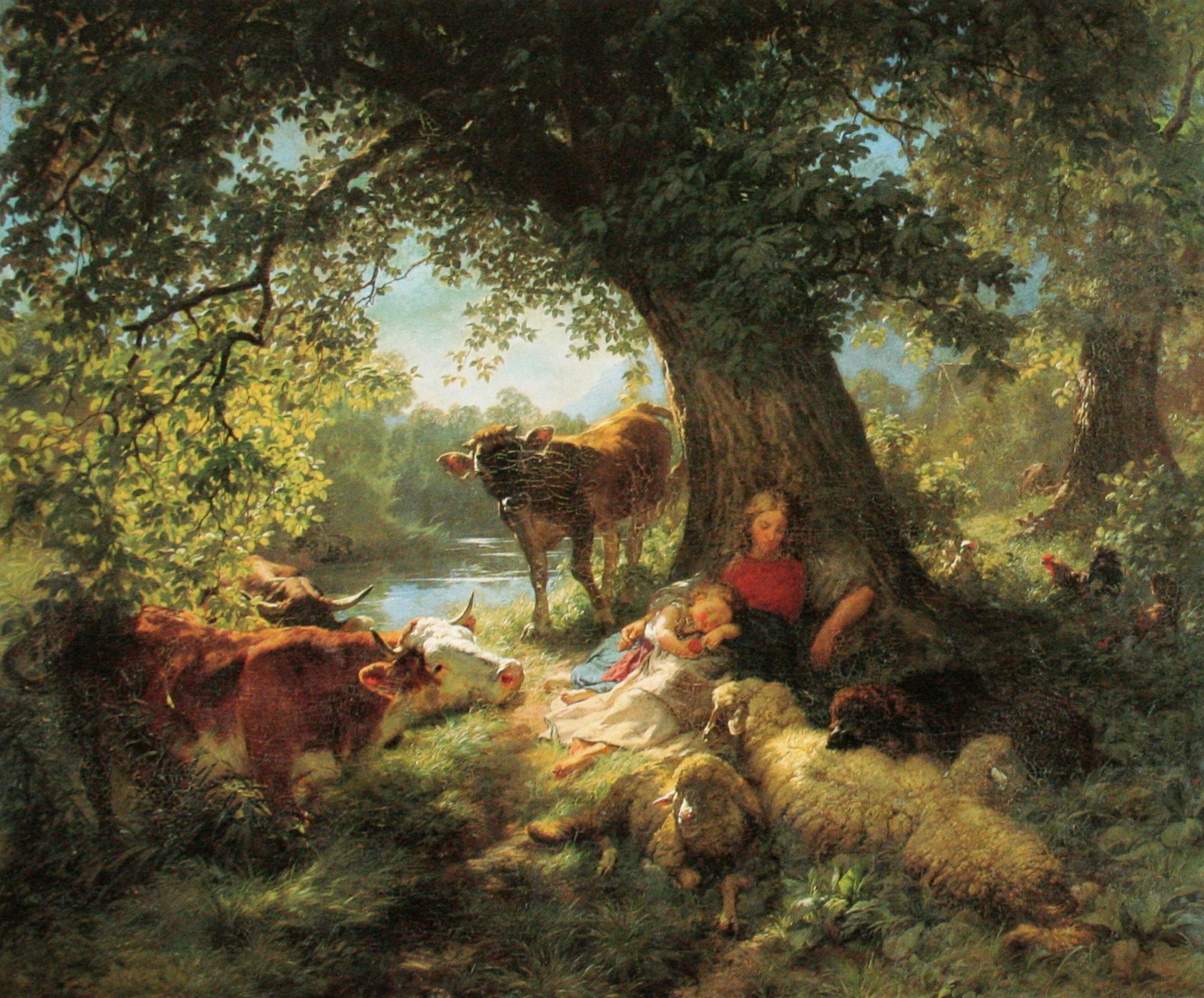
Midday Rest, 1860
Rudolf Koller's paintings of cows

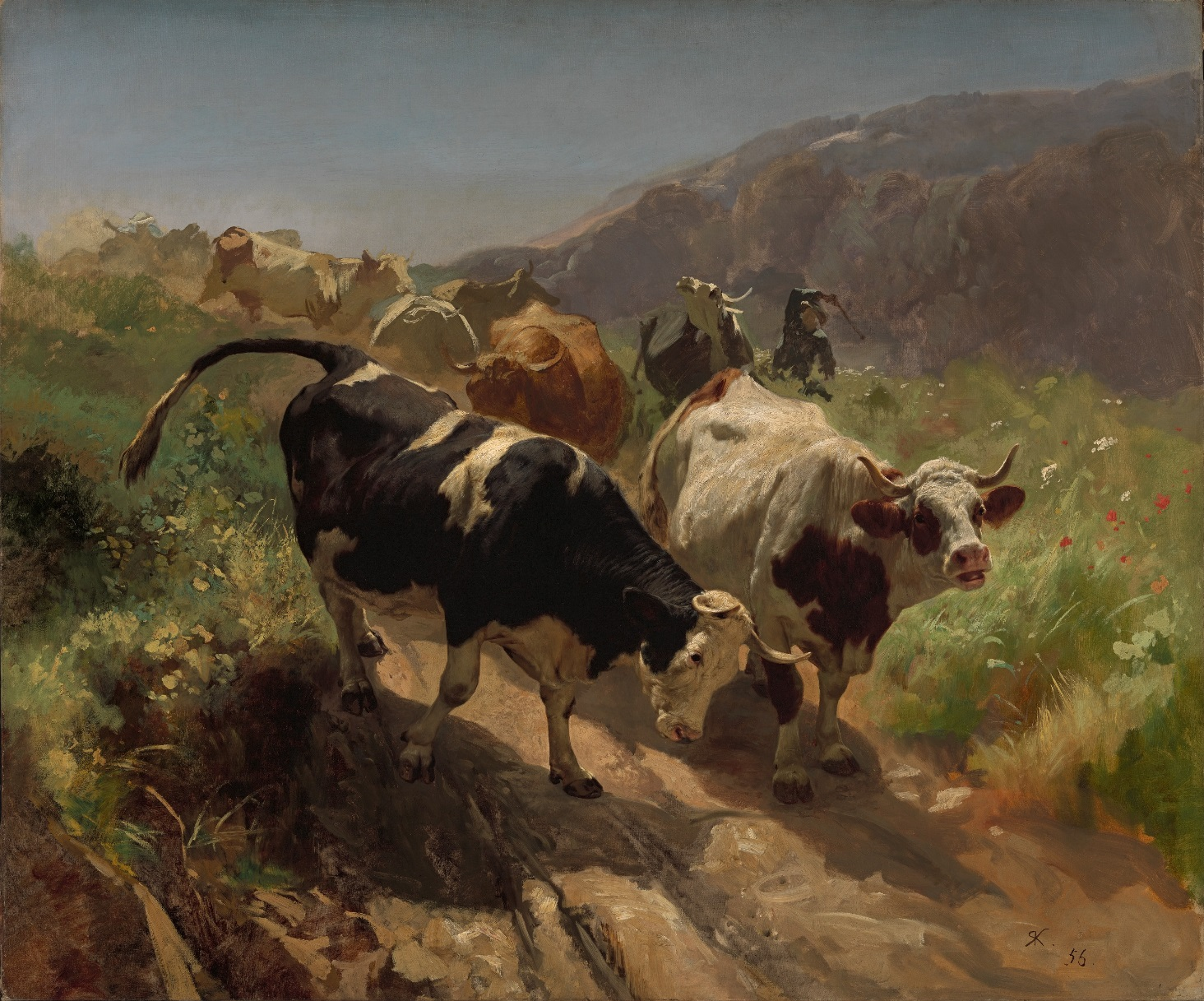
Leaving the Mountains, 1856–57

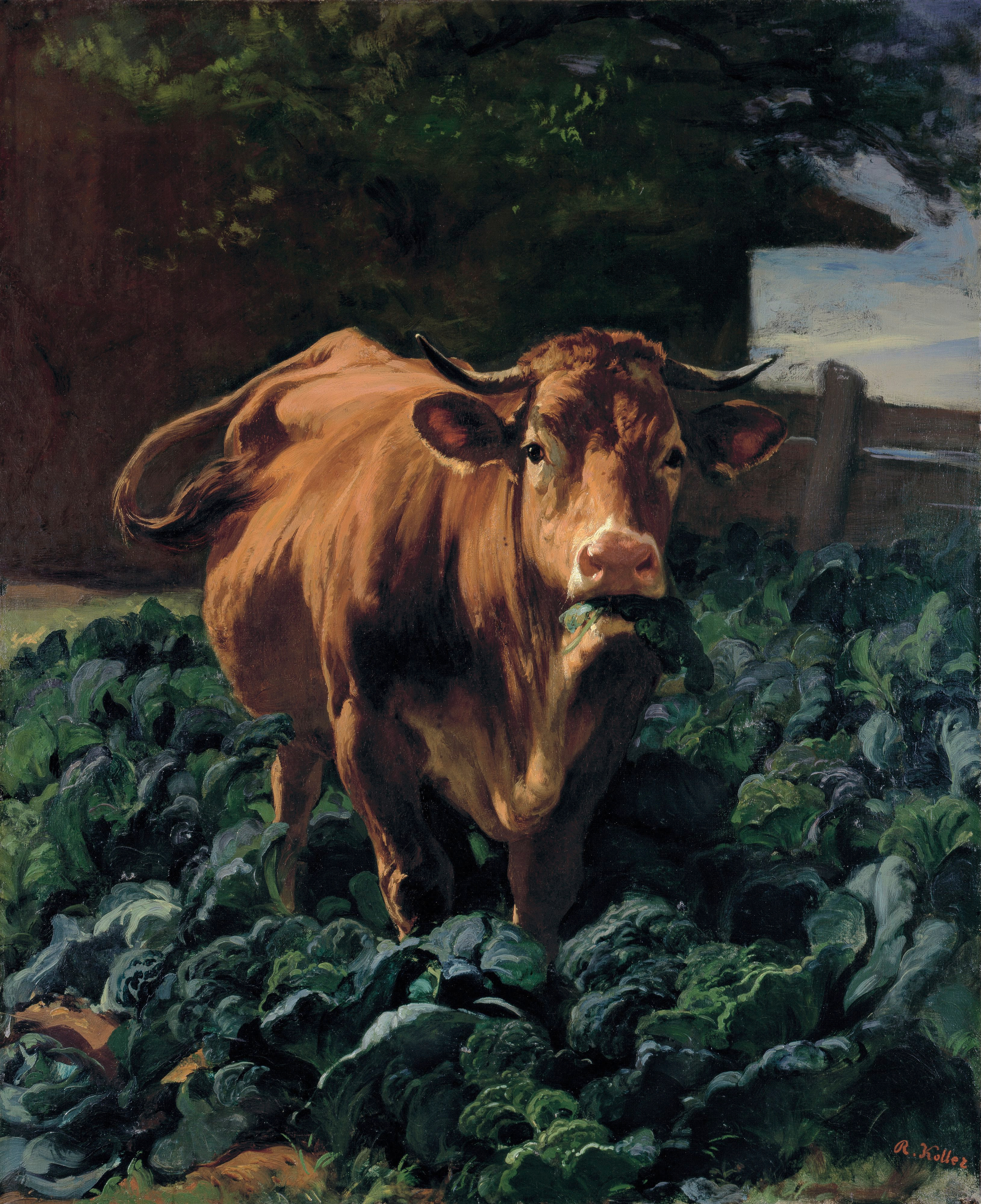
Cow in Vegetable Garden, 1857

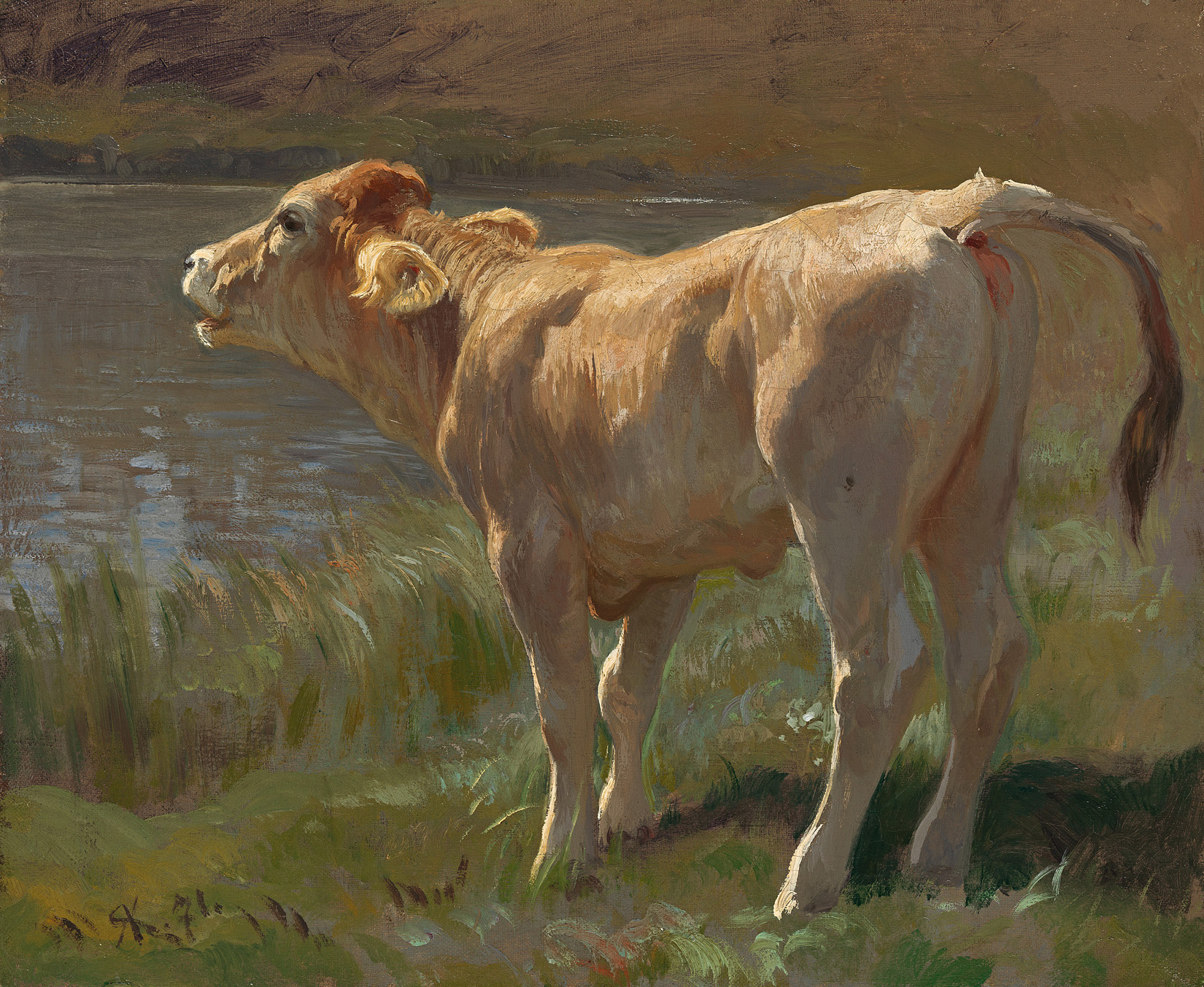
Bellowing Cow, 1871

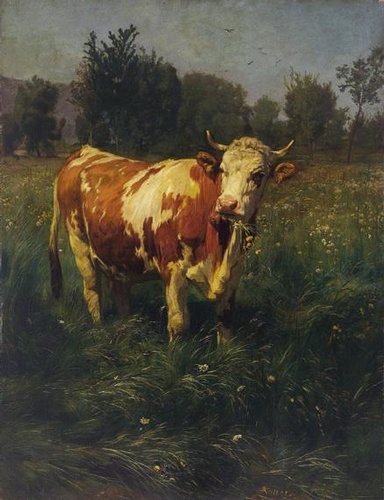
Grazing Cow, 1898

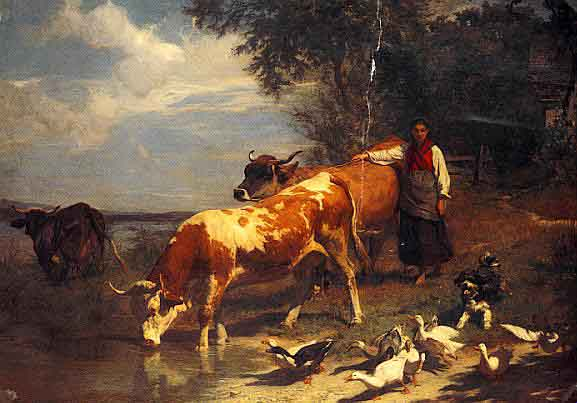
Getting a Drink
Other works

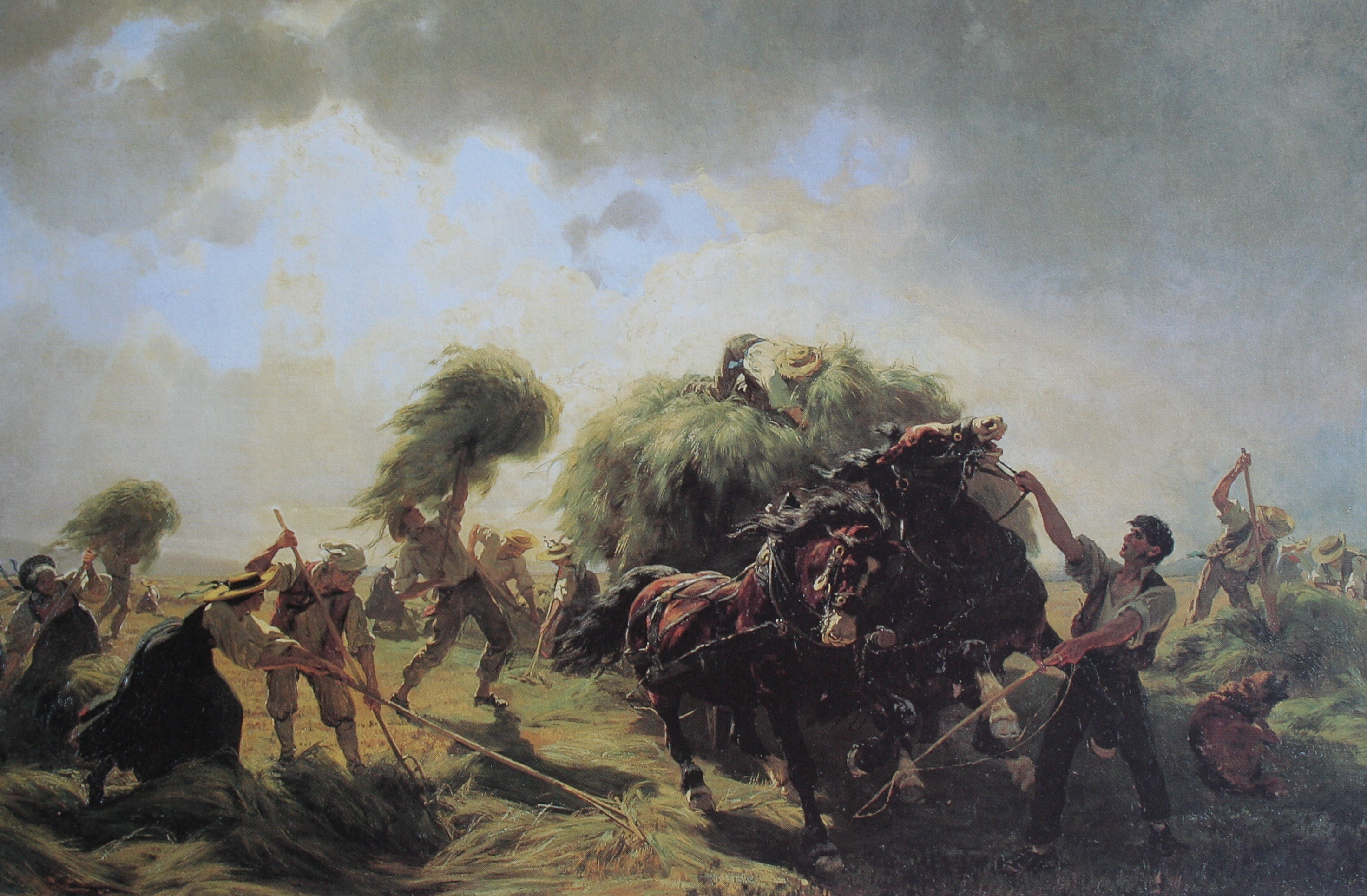
Hay Harvest in Threatening Weather, 1854

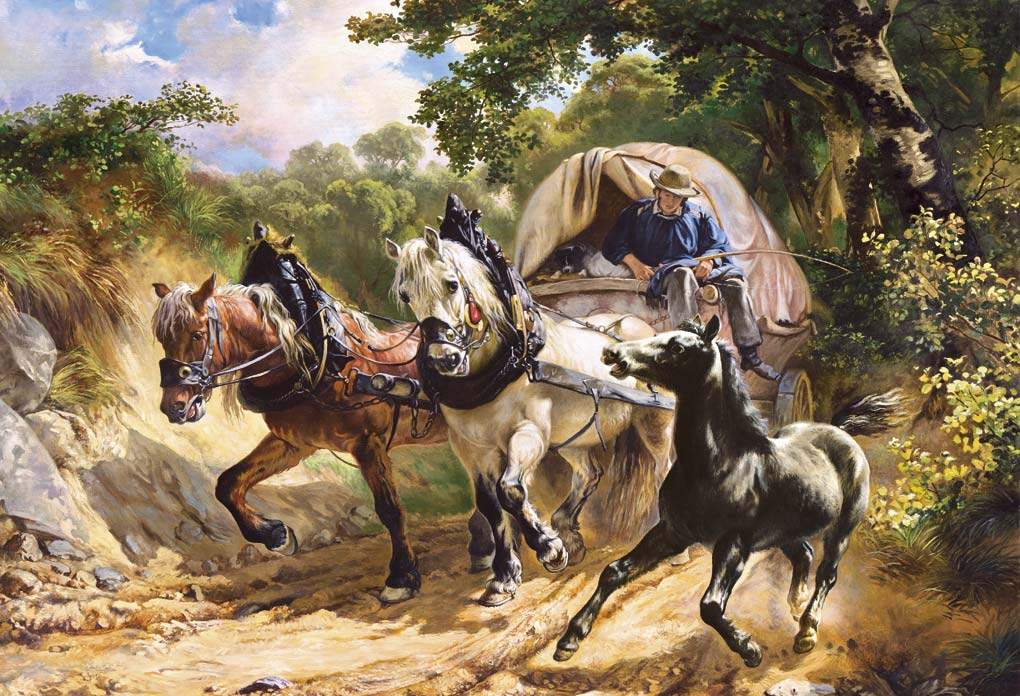
Wagon in Ravine, 1855

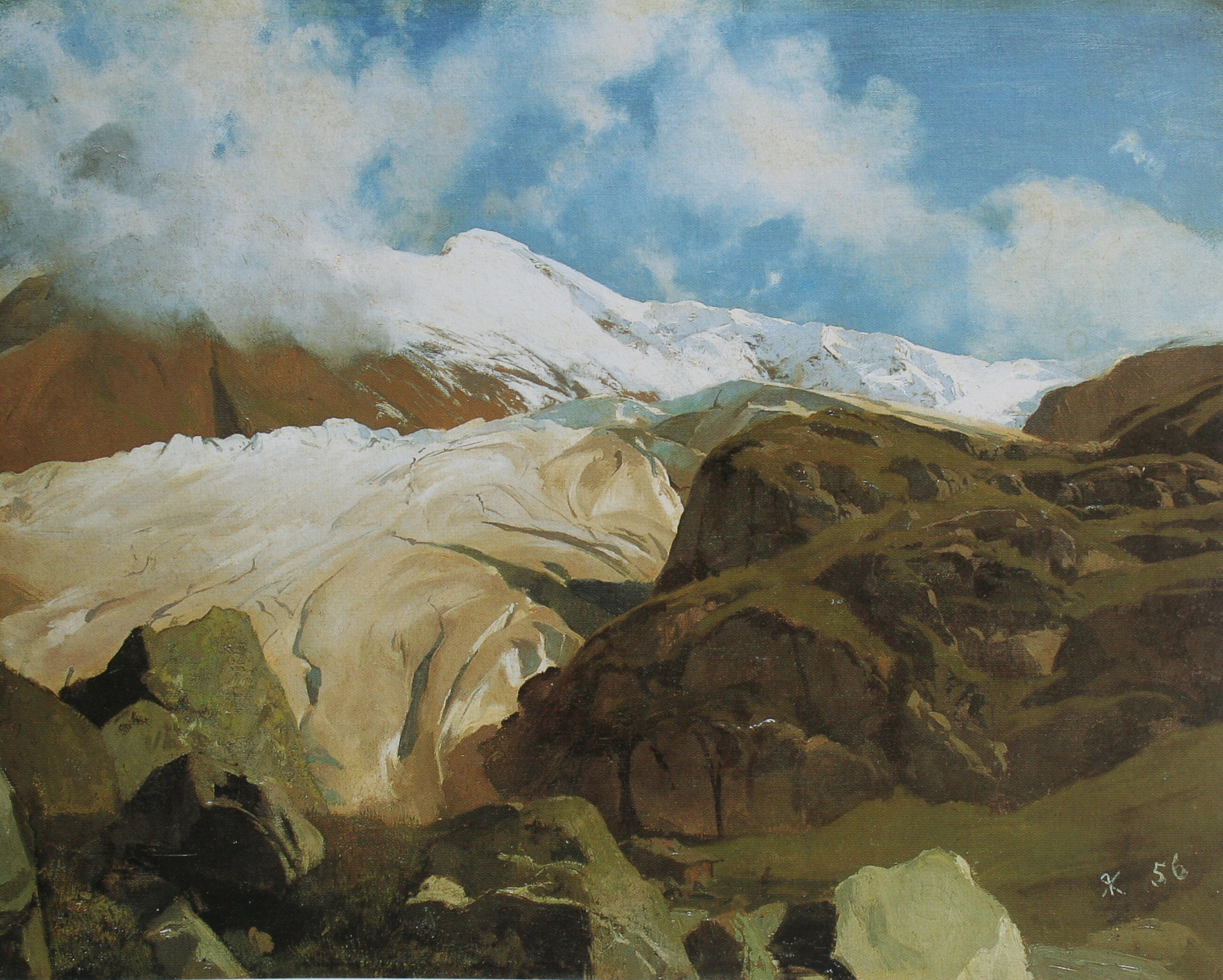
Sustenpass Glacier, 1856–57

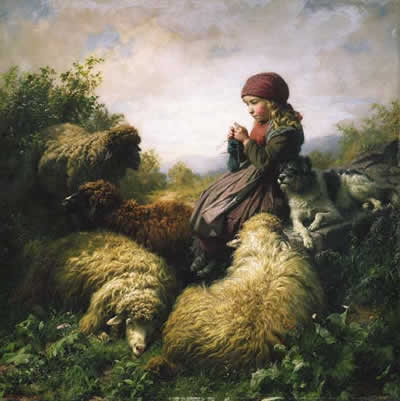
Shepherd Girl Knitting, 1859

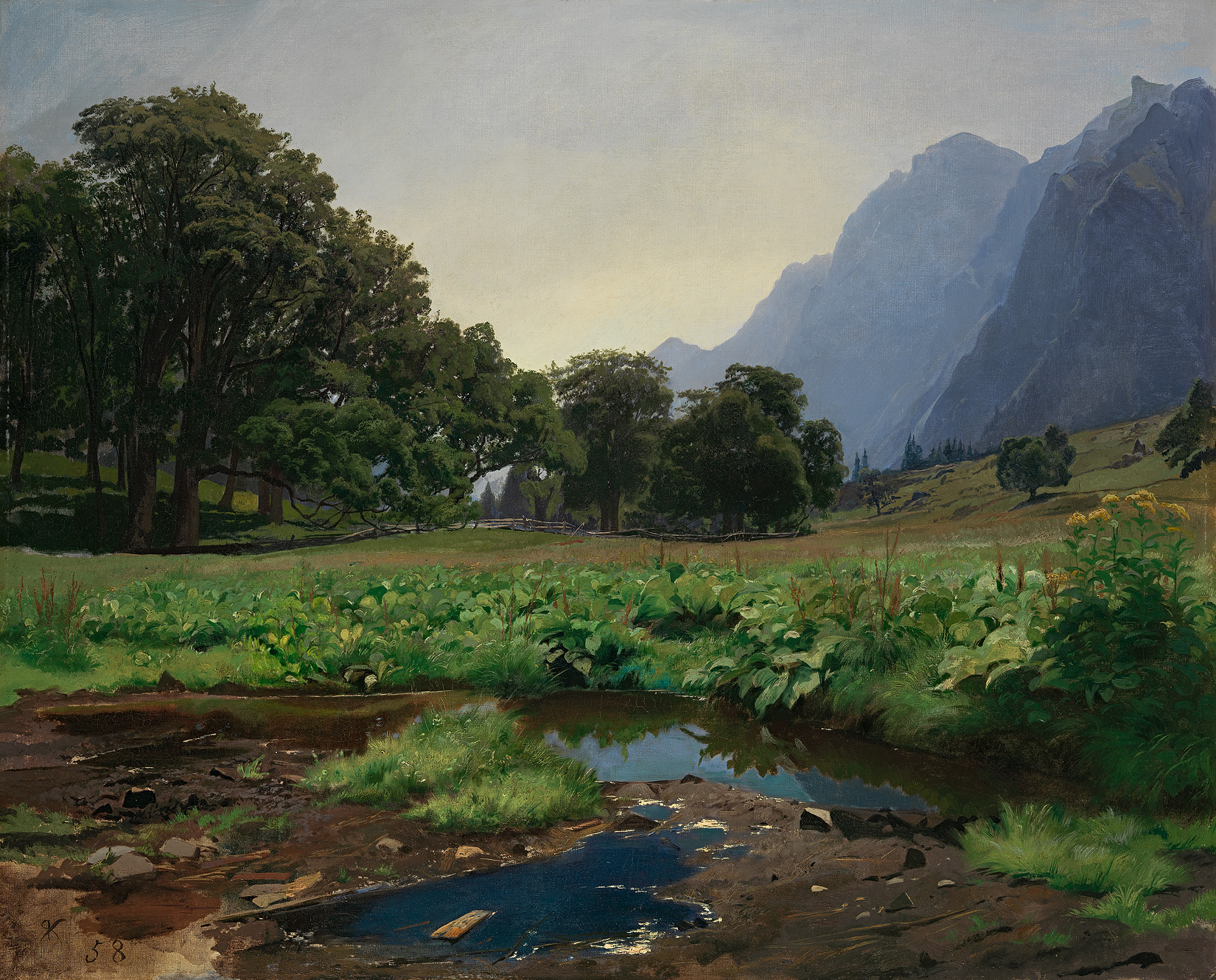
Richisau, 1858

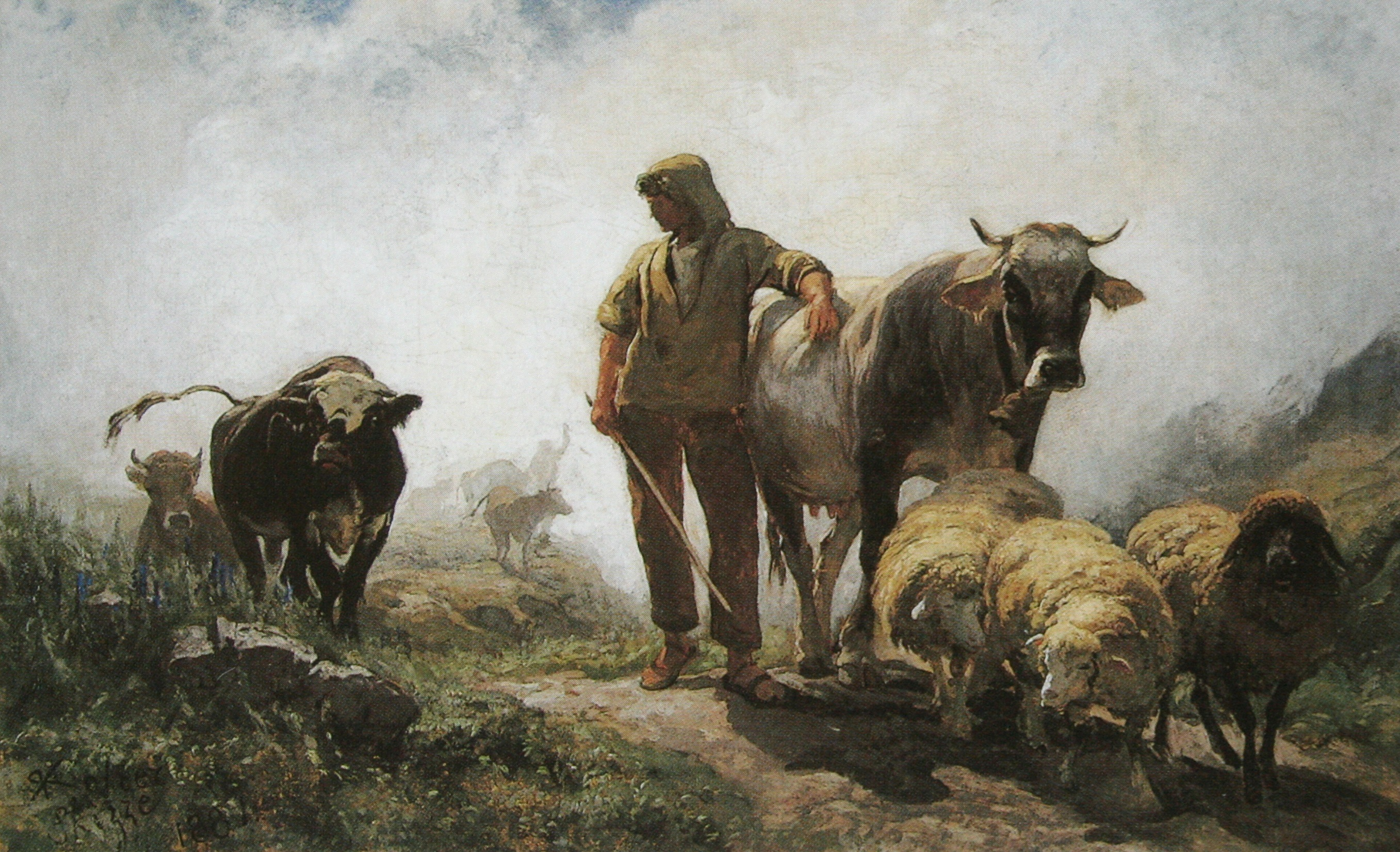
Into the Mountains, 1881

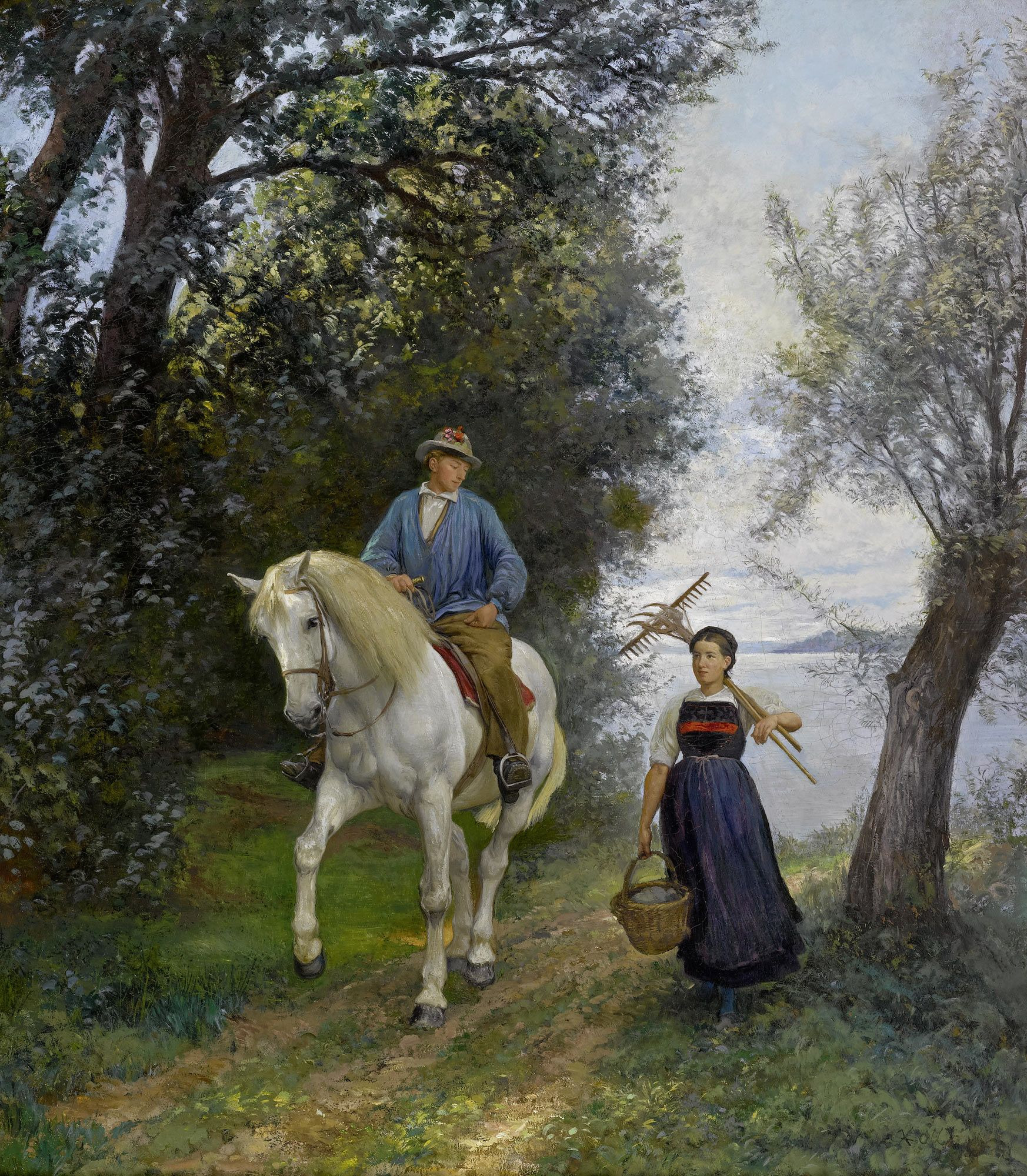
Rider and Farmer's Wife at the Lake

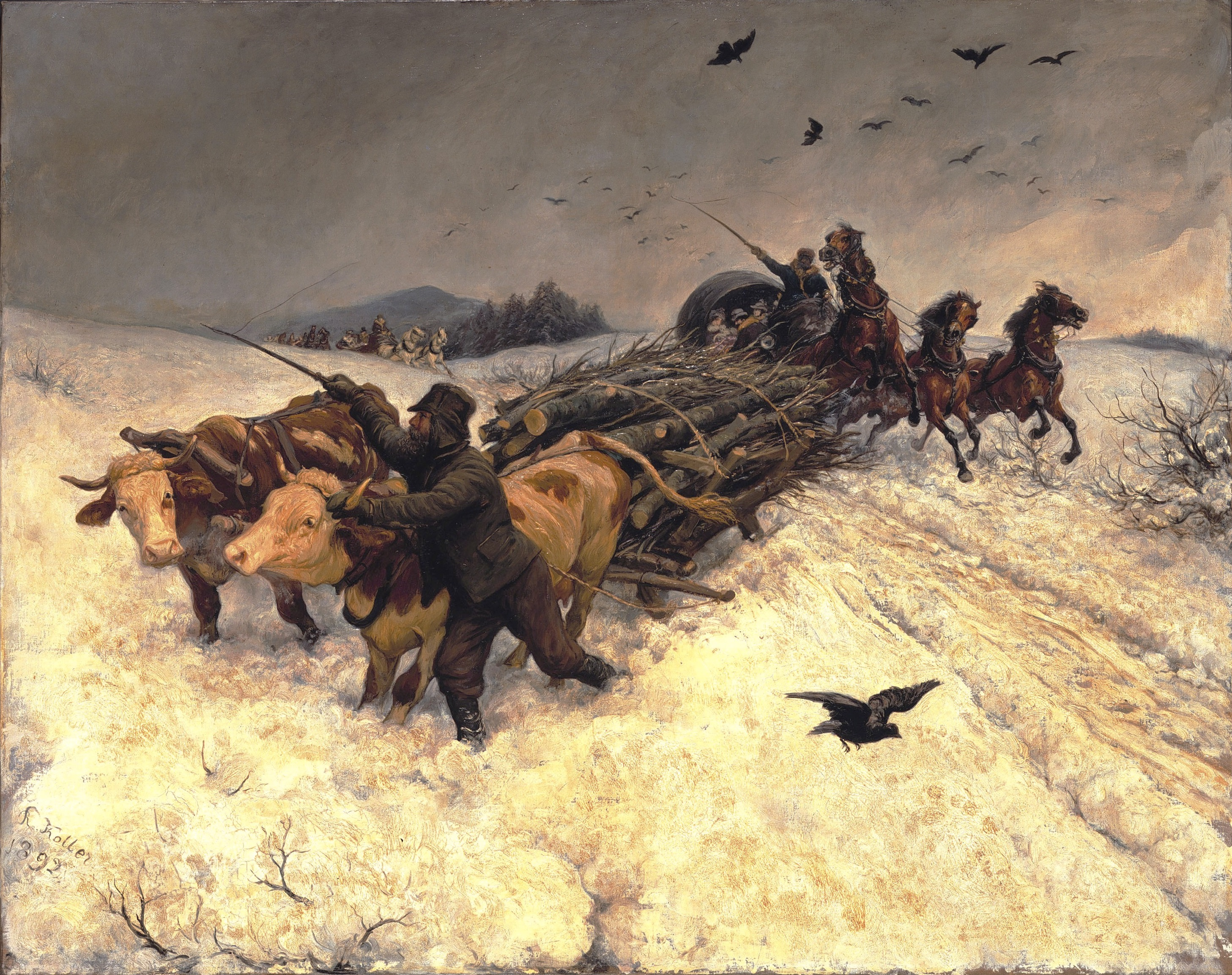
Sleigh ride, 1892

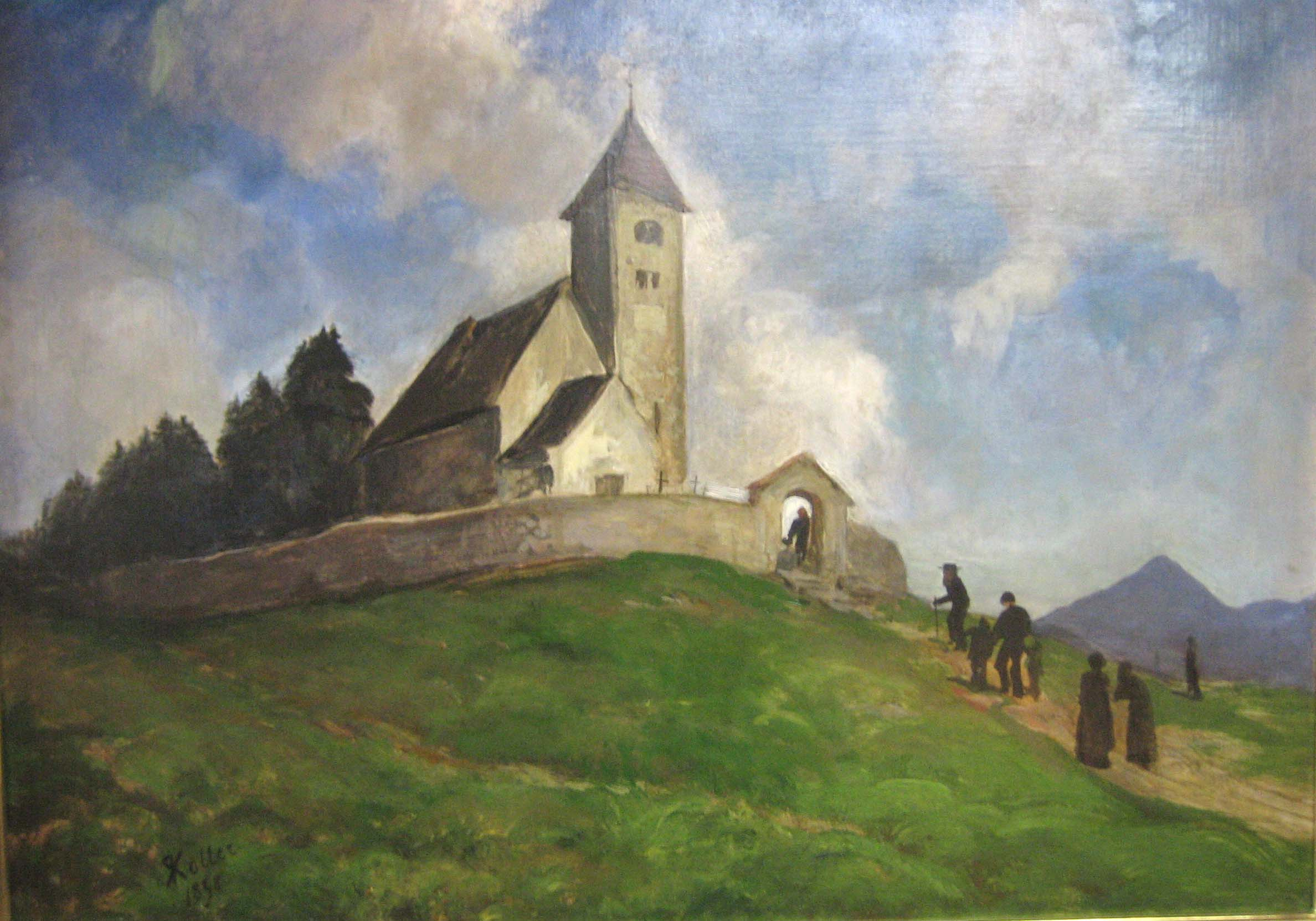
St. Remigius Church, 1898

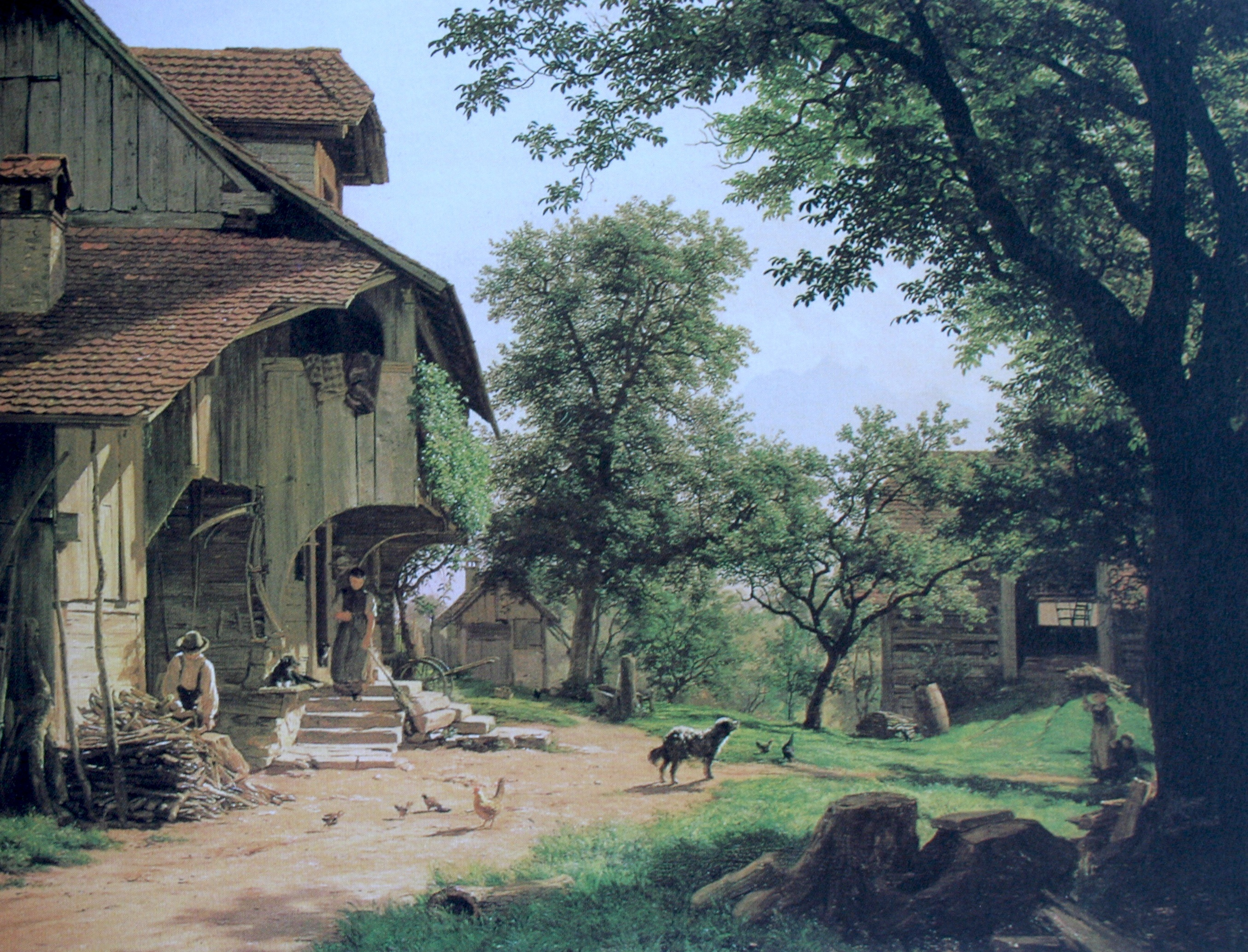
Farmyard, c. 1870

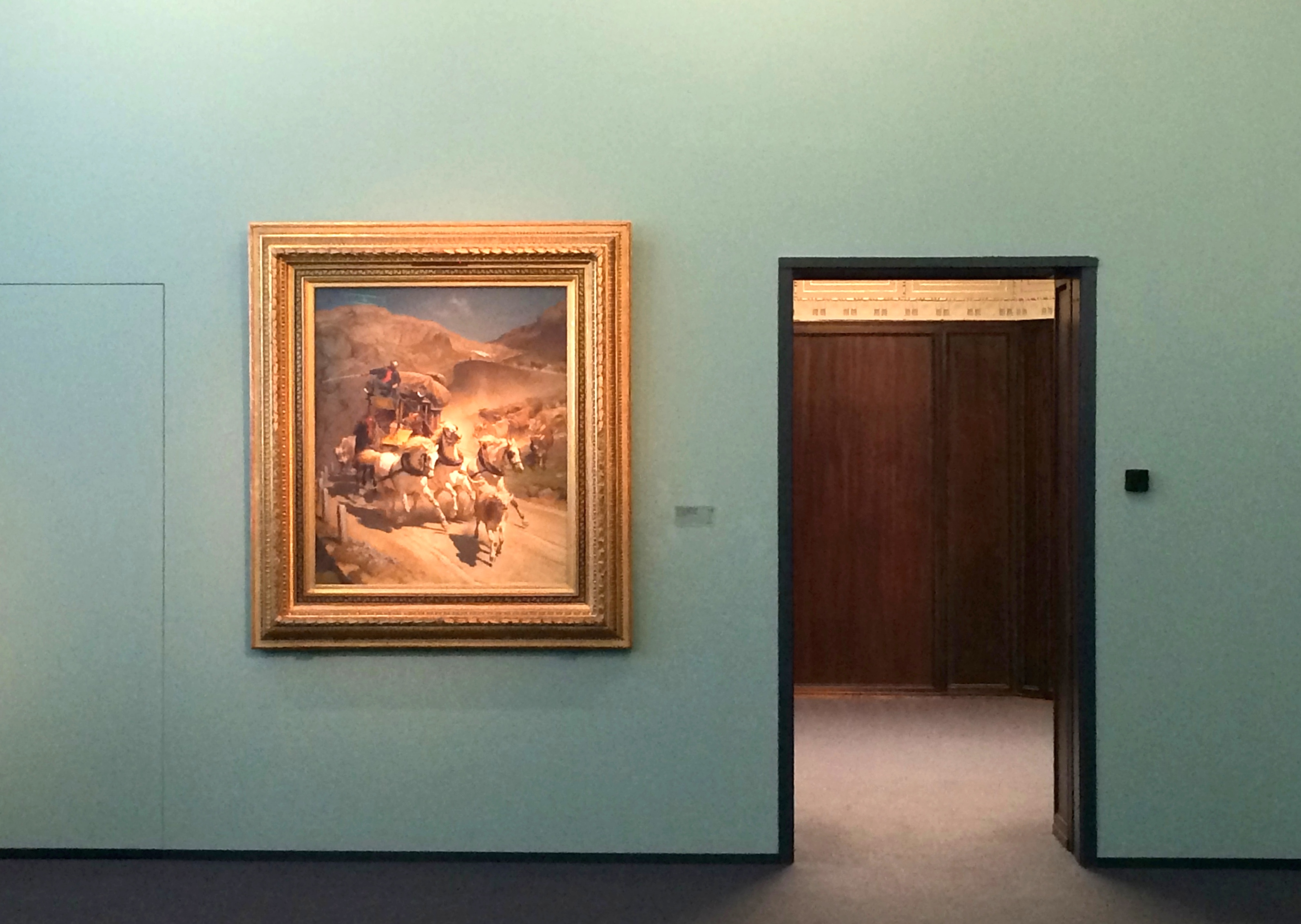
The famous painting Gotthardpost in Kunsthaus Zürich
