= Jacques Raymond Brascassat =

French painter (1804–1867)

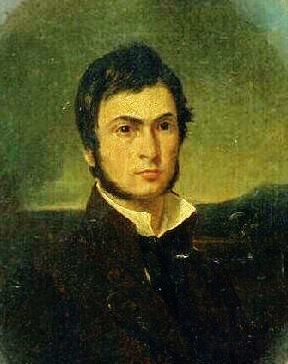
Jacques Raymond Brascassat

Jacques Raymond Brascassat (August 30, 1804 – February 28, 1867) was a French painter noted for his landscapes, and in particular his animal paintings.

== Biography ==
Brascassat was born in Bordeaux, Southwestern France, and studied art in Paris under Louis Hersent at the École des Beaux-Arts in Paris. He won second place in the Prix de Rome of 1825 with a picture of the Hunt of Meleager.

He went to Italy and painted a number of landscapes which were exhibited between 1827 and 1835, but subsequently he devoted himself mainly to animal painting, in which his reputation as an artist was made. His Bulls Fighting (1837) in the Nantes Museum of Arts, Nantes, France and a similar painting (1855) Museum of Fine Arts of Huston, Texas, US and his Cow Attacked by Wolves (1845) in Museum of Fine Arts, Leipzig, Germany, are considered some of the best of his paintings.

He was known for the accuracy of his observation, drawing and painting. He was elected a member of the Académie française in 1846. He died in Paris on 28 February 1867.

== Gallery ==
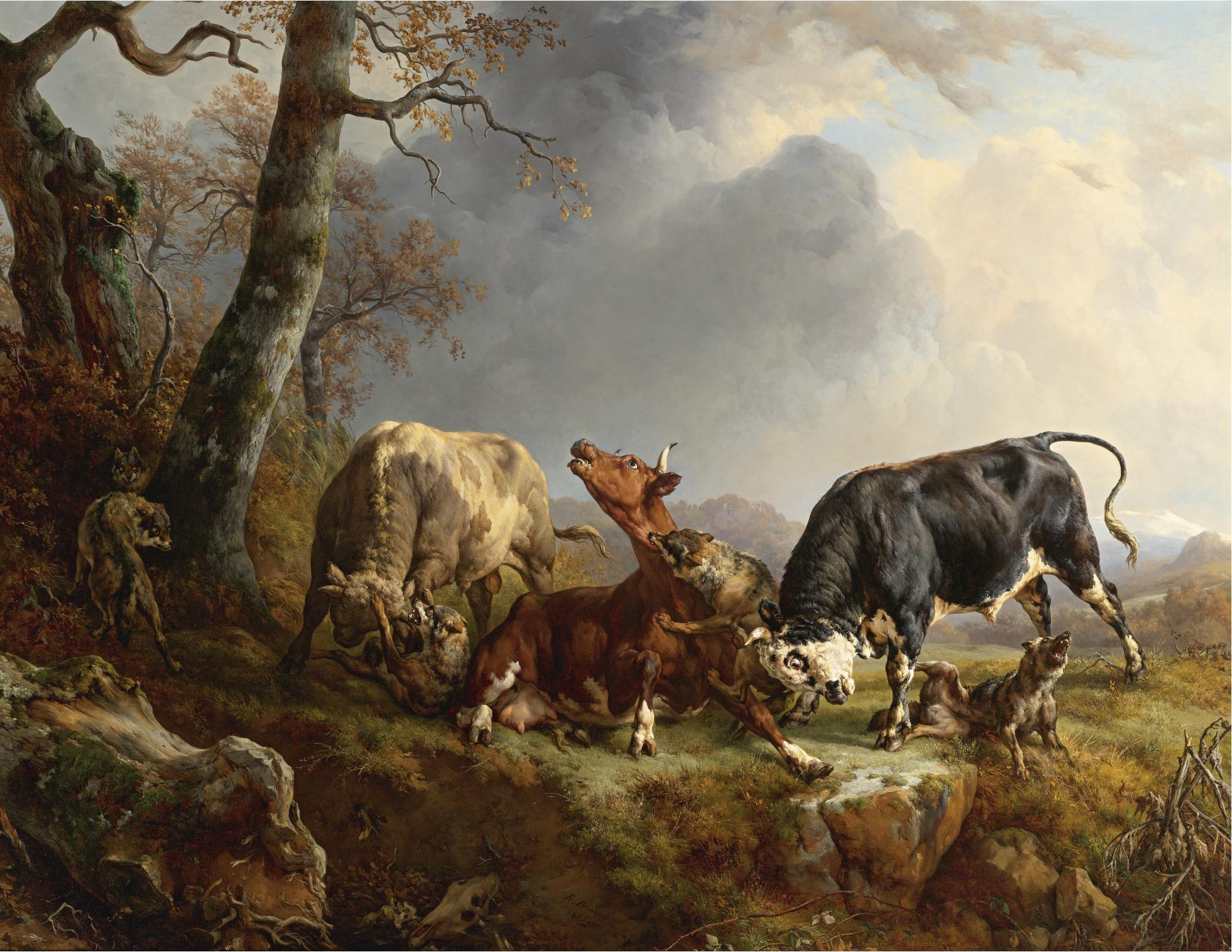
Two bulls defend a cow attacked by wolves

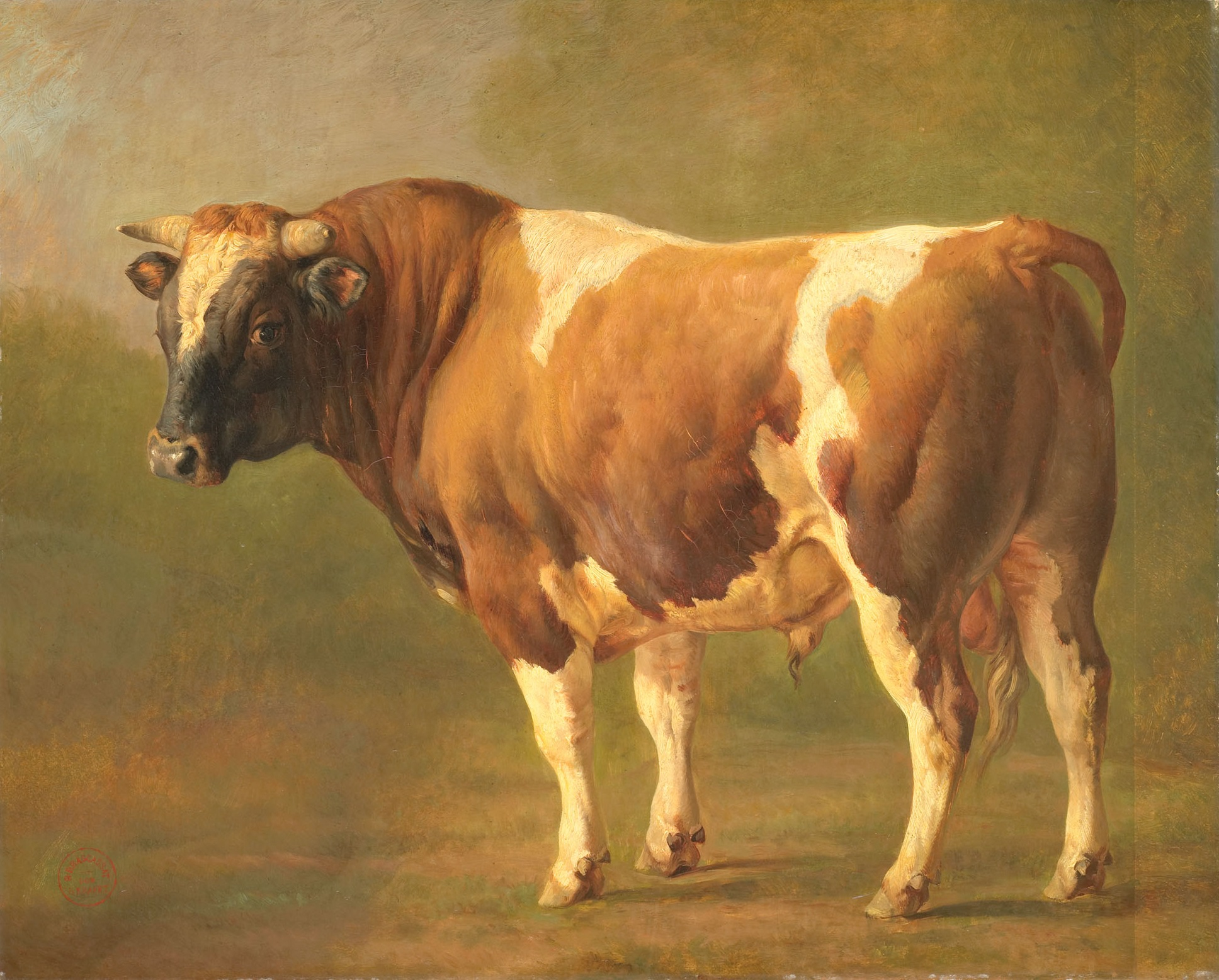
A bull

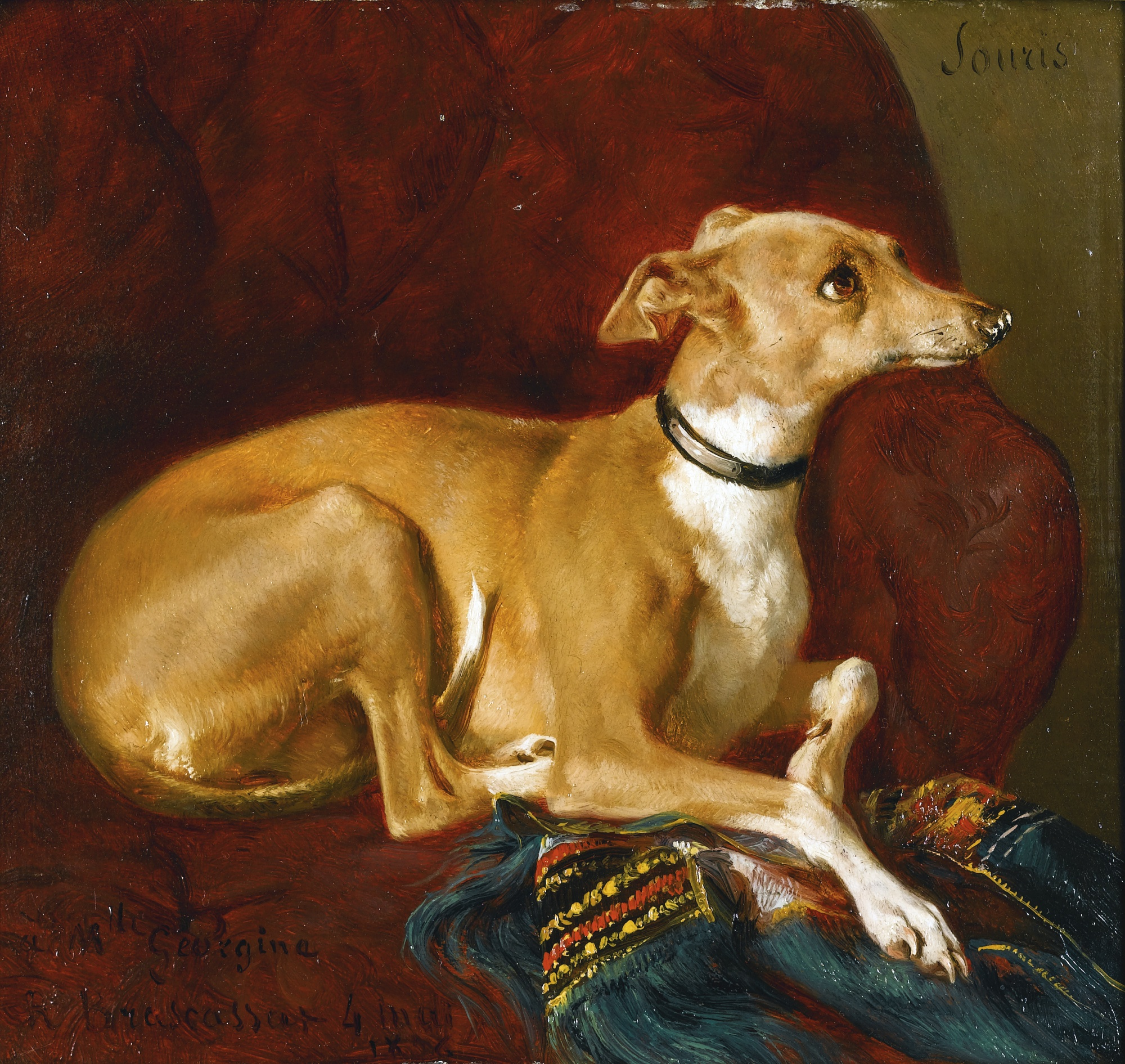
A dog

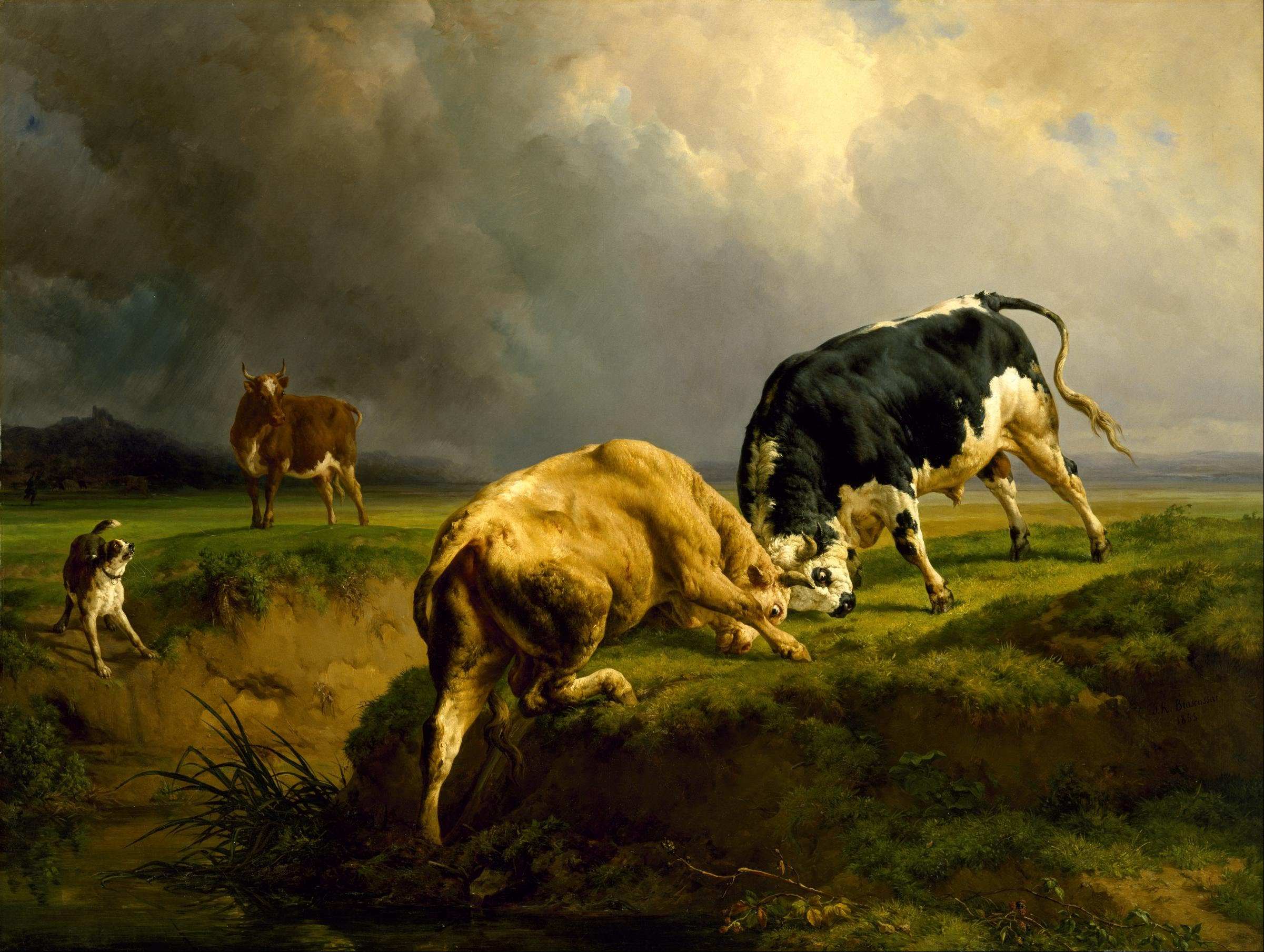
A bull fight

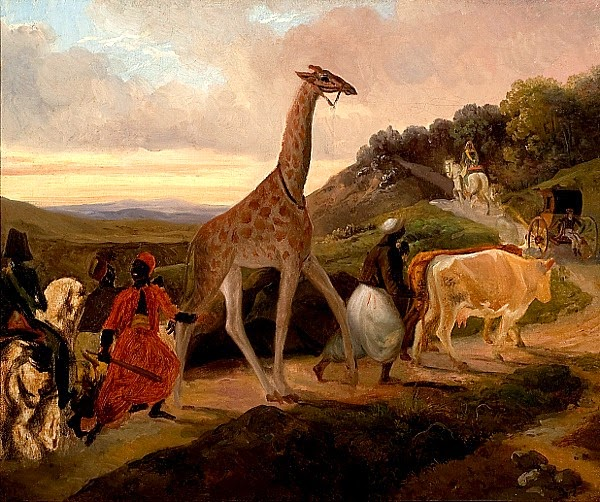
Zarafa the giraffe, journey to Paris
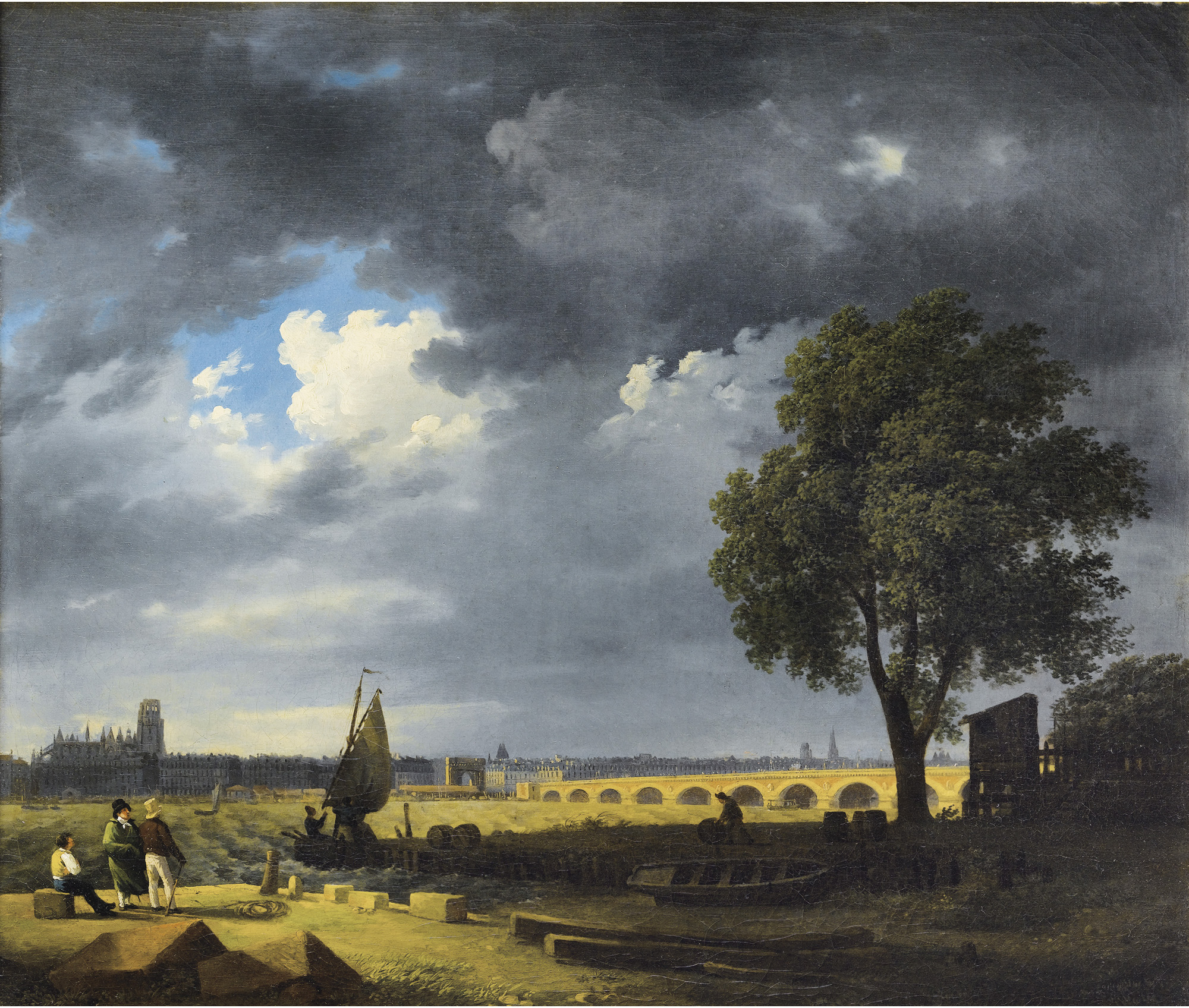
View of Bordeaux

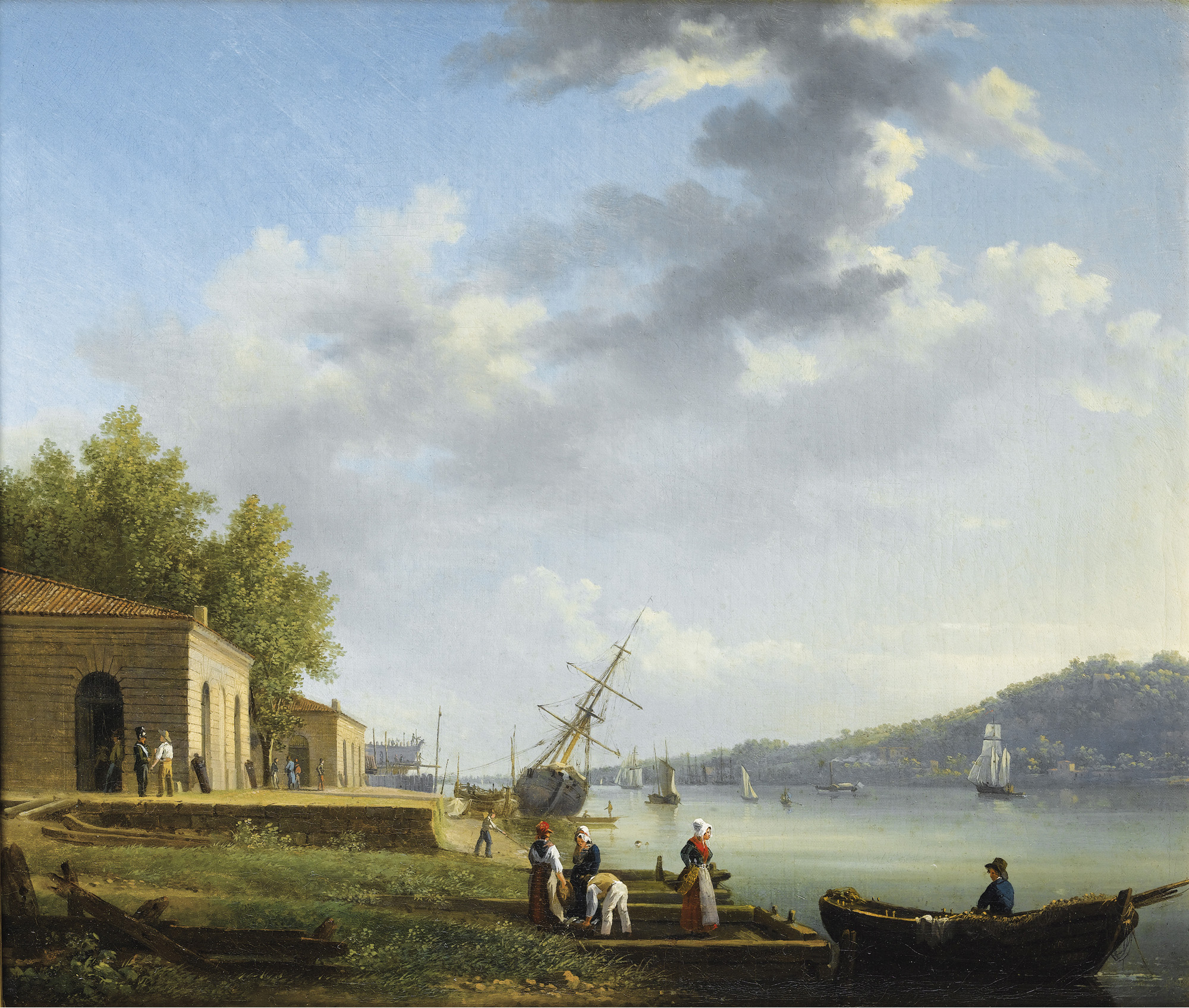
Veduta di Bordeaux 1

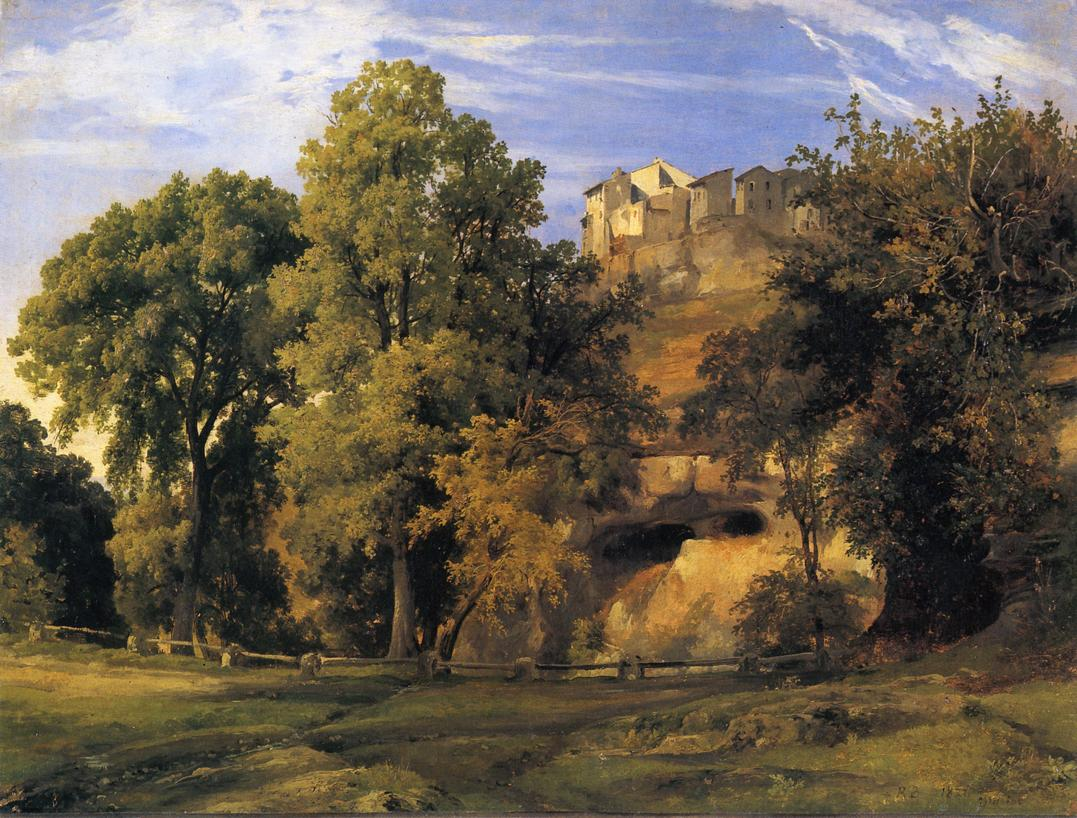
Paesaggio presso Orléans

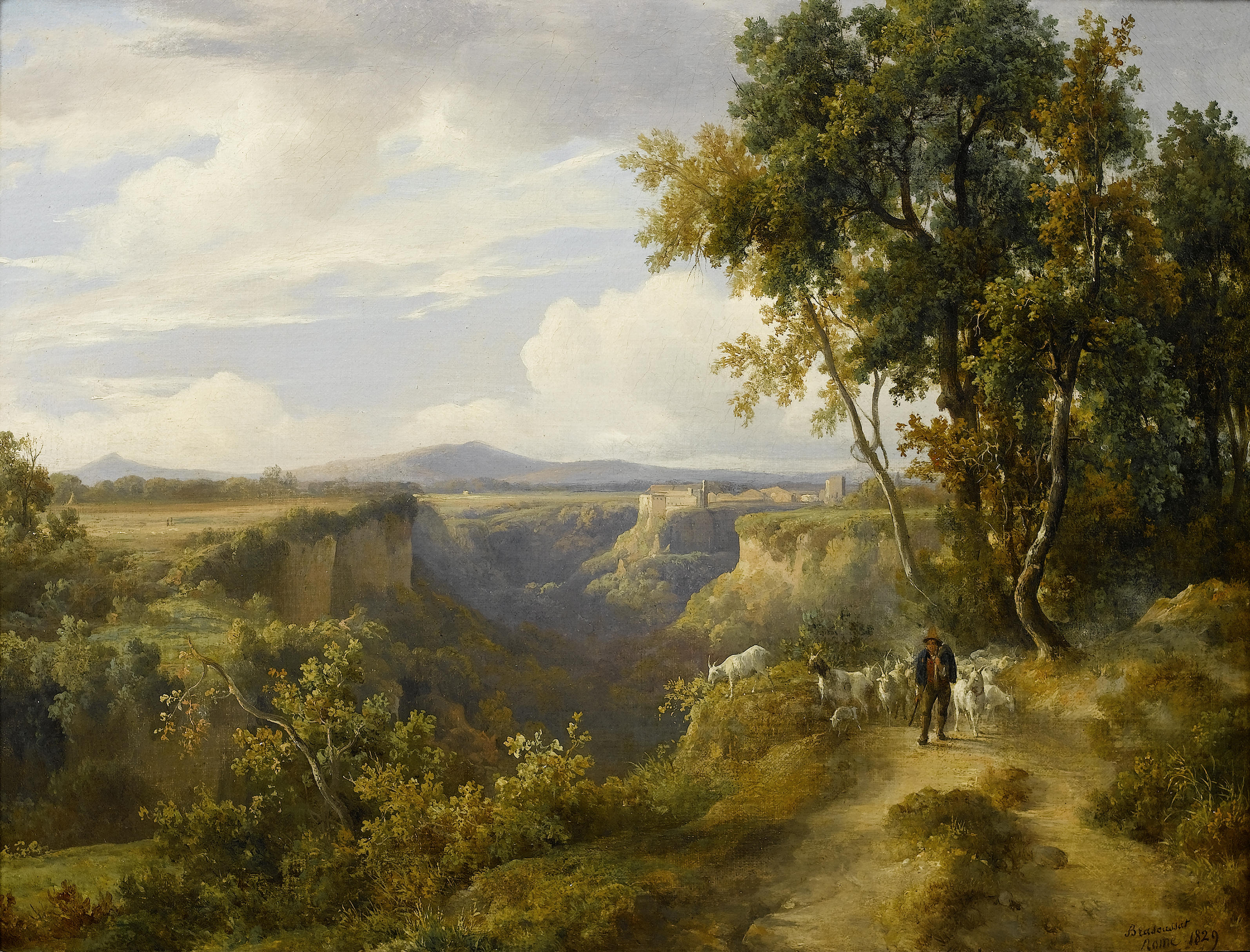
Paesaggio italiano

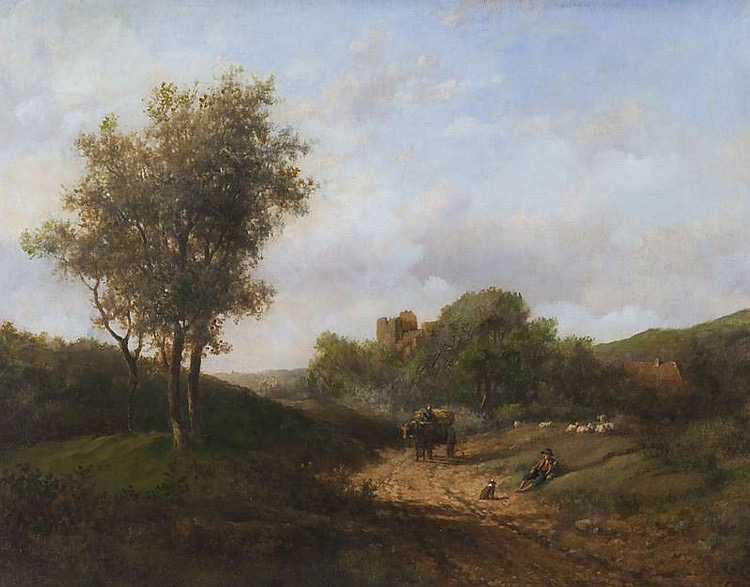
Rural Afternoon View

== See also ==
- Rudolf Koller
- Rosa Bonheur
