= Franz Hegi =

Swiss painter (1774–1850)

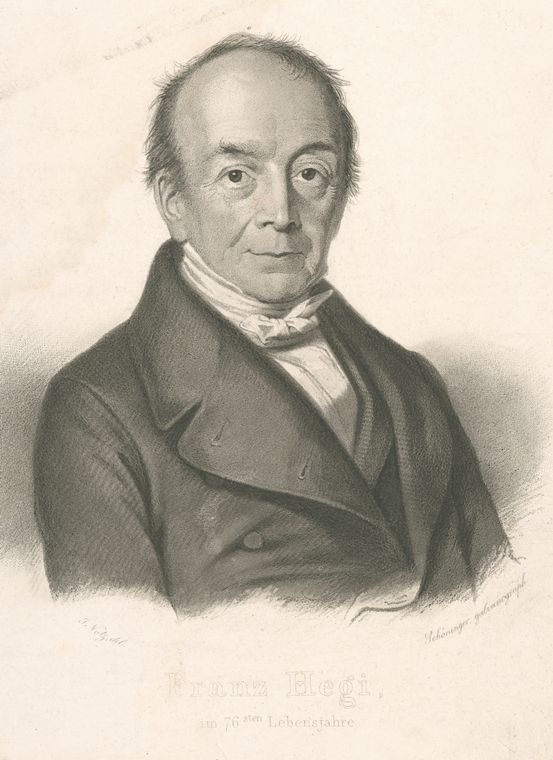
- Born: 16 April 1774; Lausanne, Switzerland
- Died: 14 March 1850 (aged 75); Zurich, Switzerland
- Known for: Drawing, engraving, etching

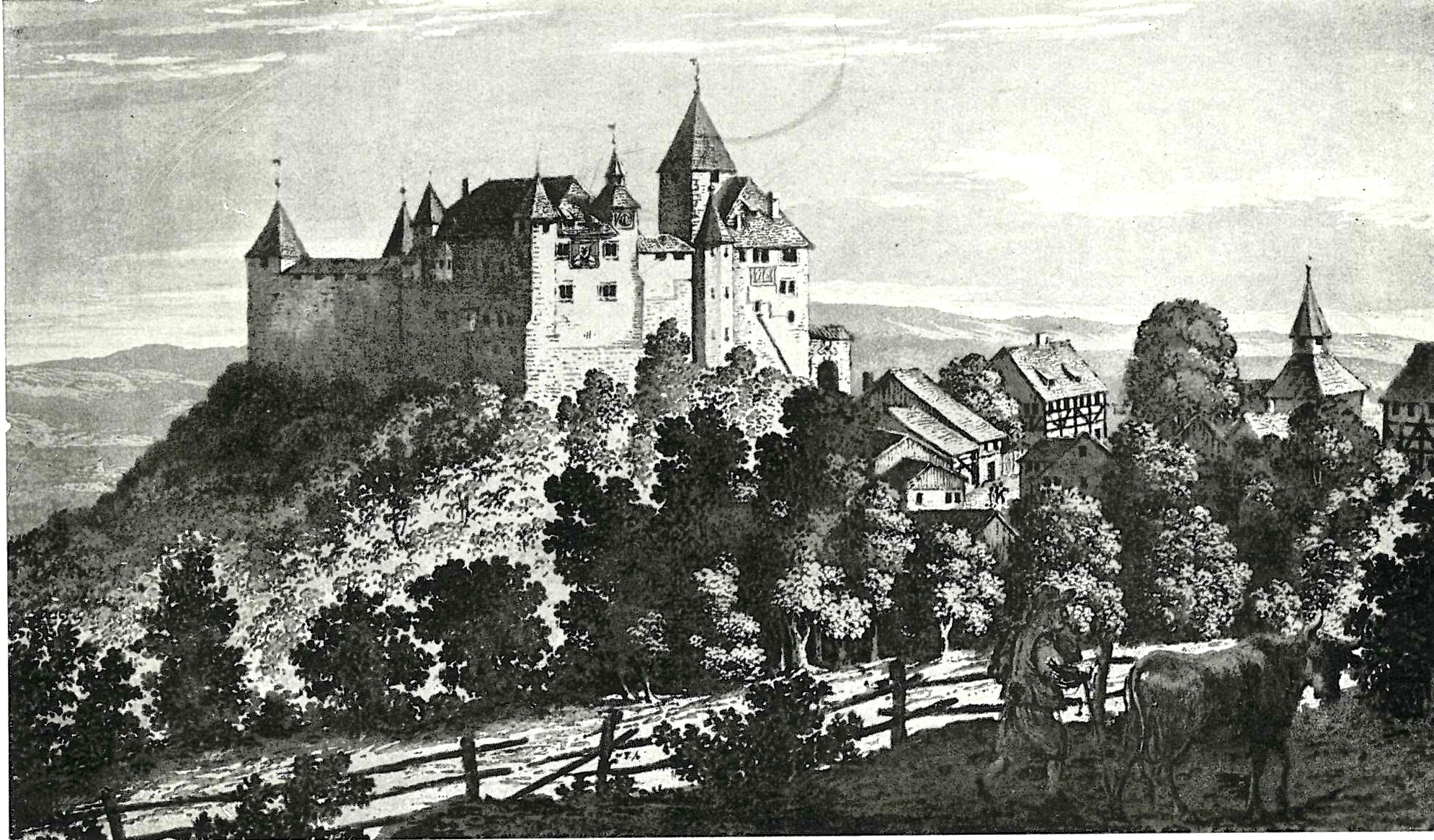
Kyburg Castle by Franz Hegi, first half of the 19th century

Franz Hegi (16 April 1774 – 14 March 1850) was a Swiss draughtsman, engraver and etcher. He was known for aquatint views of landscapes, Swiss architecture and costume depictions, as well as historical subjects connected with Zürich.

== Biography ==
Franz Hegi was born on 16 April 1774 in Lausanne. His family moved to Zürich in 1780.

In 1790, Hegi entered an apprenticeship with the etcher Matthias Pfenninger, where he learned the aquatint printmaking technique. In 1796, he moved to Basel and worked for the painter and publisher Peter Birmann. He continued to work for Birmann after returning to Zürich in 1802.

Hegi began making etchings in 1804. He later became known as an illustrator of Neujahrsblätter, almanacs and literary works. In the 1820s, he collaborated with his friend Ludwig Vogel on studies of the Codex Manesse and monuments in Père Lachaise Cemetery in Paris.

In 1821, Hegi married his cousin Magdalena Hegi. He also served as an artillery captain. He died in Zürich on 14 March 1850.

== Work ==
Hegi worked as a draughtsman, engraver and etcher. His subjects included landscape views, Swiss architectural scenes and costume studies, many of them produced in aquatint between 1809 and the early 1820s. After returning to Zürich, he focused especially on small-scale views of Swiss landscapes and historical subjects.

Hegi illustrated the Helvetischer Almanach, Alpenrosen, the publications of the Antiquarische Gesellschaft in Zürich, and Neujahrsblätter issued by several Zürich societies. His drawings and prints are valued for their detailed visual record of landscapes and buildings, particularly in Zürich.

== Collections ==
Hegi's works are held in public collections including the Kupferstichkabinett Basel, the Swiss National Library in Bern, the Graphische Sammlung ETH Zürich, Kunsthaus Zürich and Zentralbibliothek Zürich.
