= Gonzenbach =

Gonzenbach is a surname. Notable people with the surname include:

- Carl Arnold Gonzenbach (1806–1885), Swiss painter
- Carl August Gonzenbach (1779–1851), Swiss merchant and politician
- Carl Emil Viktor von Gonzenbach (1816–1886), Swiss merchant and politician
- Laura Gonzenbach (1842–1878), Swiss fairy tale collector
