= Carl Gonzenbach =

Carl Gonzenbach may refer to:

- Carl August Gonzenbach (1779–1851), Swiss merchant and politician
- Carl Arnold Gonzenbach (1806–1885), Swiss painter and engraver

== See also ==
- Carl Emil Viktor von Gonzenbach (1816–1886), Swiss merchant and politician
