= Hans Jakob Oeri =

Swiss painter, draftsman and lithographer

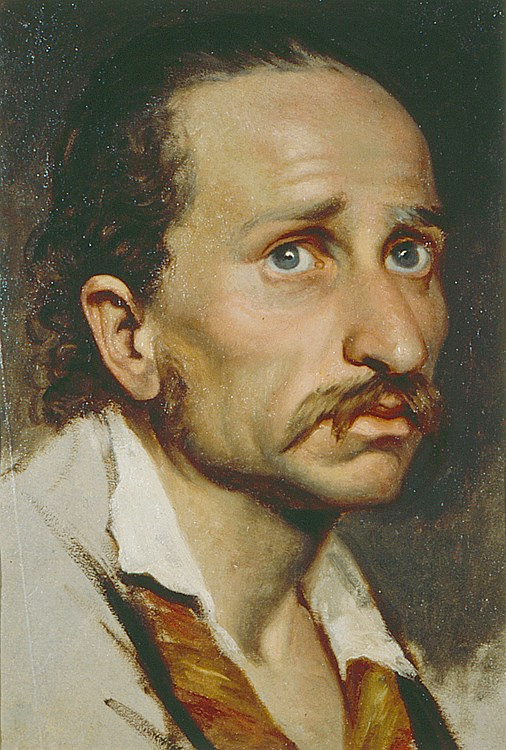
Self-portrait (1810s)

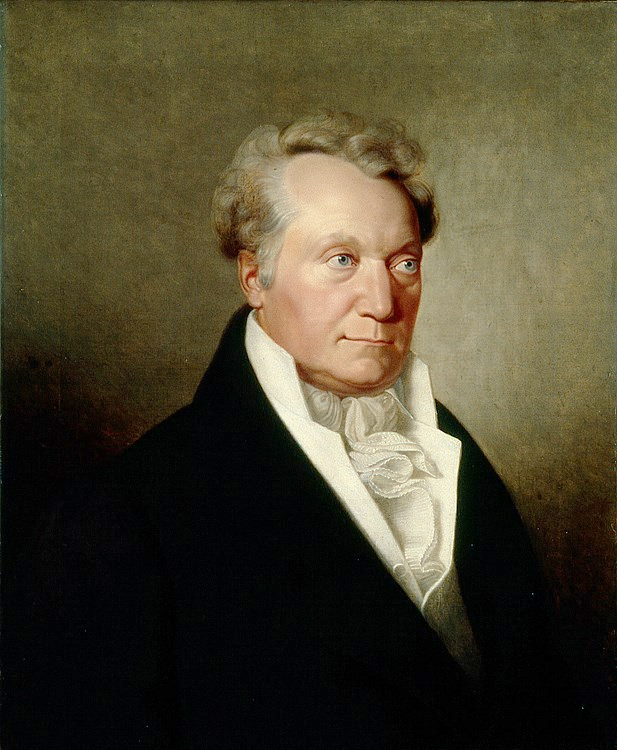
Portrait of the biologist and publisher, Paul Usteri

Hans Jakob Oeri (16 December 1782, Kyburg - 24 February 1868, Zürich) was a Swiss portrait and history painter, draftsman and lithographer.

== Biography ==
His father was a pastor. He spent his childhood in Kyburg und Regensdorf. From 1800 he was a pupil of the landscape painter, Johann Kaspar Kuster (1747-1818), who came from Winterthur. After two years of study, he presented a self-portrait at an exhibit in Zürich and received praise from Johann Martin Usteri.

In 1803, he and his friend, the portrait painter David Sulzer, travelled together to Paris, where he spent four years studying with Jacques-Louis David. He displayed several portraits at exhibitions there and in Zürich in 1804 and 1805. He decided to devote himself primarily to portrait painting and, in 1807, became a member of the Künstlergesellschaft (artists' society).

In 1809, he travelled to Russia in the company of the landscape painter, Jakob Christoph Miville, of Basel. They initially visited Moscow. When Miville moved on to St.Petersburg, Oeri remained; working as a portrait painter and art teacher. He was an eyewitness to the Fire of Moscow in 1812 and lost many of his works. He responded by painting pictures of the fire and its aftermath. Altogether, he was there for eight years, then spent a short time in Lübeck before returning to Zürich.

In addition to his original paintings, he made lithographs of the works of Hans Holbein the Younger, Raphael, Friedrich Overbeck, and others. In 1851, on the occasion of Zürich's five-hundredth anniversary as a member of the Swiss Federation he, with Ludwig Vogel, David Eduard Steiner and Johann Conrad Zeller, created decorations for the Zürich Festhütte (festival "hut"). Together, they painted a panorama called Rückkehr der siegreichen Zürcher aus der Schlacht bei Tättwil (Return of the Victorious Zürichers from the Battle of Tättwil). Oeri, by himself, did a series of costume studies.

After his death, numerous historical paintings, which he had never shown in public, were found at his estate.
