= Johann Conrad Zeller =

Swiss painter (1807–1856)

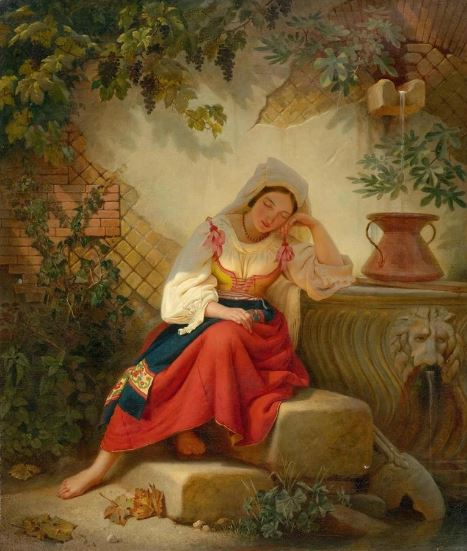
Italian Girl by a Fountain

Johann Konrad Zeller (2 May 1807, Weinegg - 1 March 1856, Weinegg) was a Swiss painter. He worked in several genres, including landscapes, portraits, and historical scenes. In addition to his paintings, he produced a large number of anatomical drawings, many of which were done in watercolors.

== Biography ==
He was born to Heinrich Zeller, a silk manufacturer, and his wife Maria née Füssli, the daughter of a prominent politician. His brother, Heinrich (1810–1897), was a merchant and amateur artist who married Anna Horner, the daughter of the mathematician Johann Kaspar Horner.

His artistic ability was evident by the age of ten. He was given his first drawing lessons by the engraver Georg Christoph Friedrich Oberkogler (1774–1856). Later, he studied oil painting with the landscape painter Konrad Gessner. Upon completing his studies, his father wanted him to receive a commercial education as well, so he would be able to take over the family business.

He agreed and, in 1825, went to Turin, where he spent two years as an apprentice in a trading house. When he completed his training, his father gave him the position of accountant, but he continued to paint in his free time.. Finally, in 1832, he asked his father if he could give up his position and devote himself to painting full time. His father agreed, and he went to Rome for further studies.

He was accompanied by the architect Heinrich Keller, who introduced him to other German-speaking artists living there. He also made contact with Horace Vernet, the Director of the French Academy in Rome. He spent fifteen years there as an independent artist, and participated in numerous exhibitions.

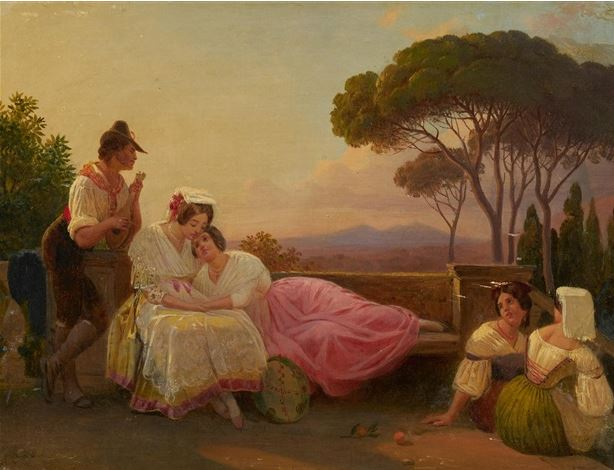
An Evening Party in Tivoli

In 1847, he returned to Zürich, where he continued to paint Italian landscapes. In 1851, on the 300th anniversary of Zürich's accession into the Swiss Confederacy, he joined Ludwig Vogel, David Eduard Steiner and Hans Jakob Oeri to decorate the festival hut. They chose to depict the victorious Zürchers, returning from the Battle of Dättwil.

In 1855, his declining health forced him to spend some time recuperating at a spa in the mountains. Early the following year, he succumbed to heart disease. He had never married and left no children.
