= David Steiner =

David Steiner may refer to:

- David Steiner (academic) (born 1958), New York State Education Commissioner and President of the University of the State of New York
- David Steiner (lobbyist), American businessman and former President of AIPAC, resigned 1992
- David Eduard Steiner (1811–1860), Swiss painter
- David J. Steiner (1965–2016), American documentary filmmaker, educator and political activist
- David P. Steiner (born 1960), American business executive and current U.S. Postmaster General
- David Steiner, blogger targeted in the eBay stalking scandal
