= Samuel Birmann =

Swiss landscape painter (1793–1847)

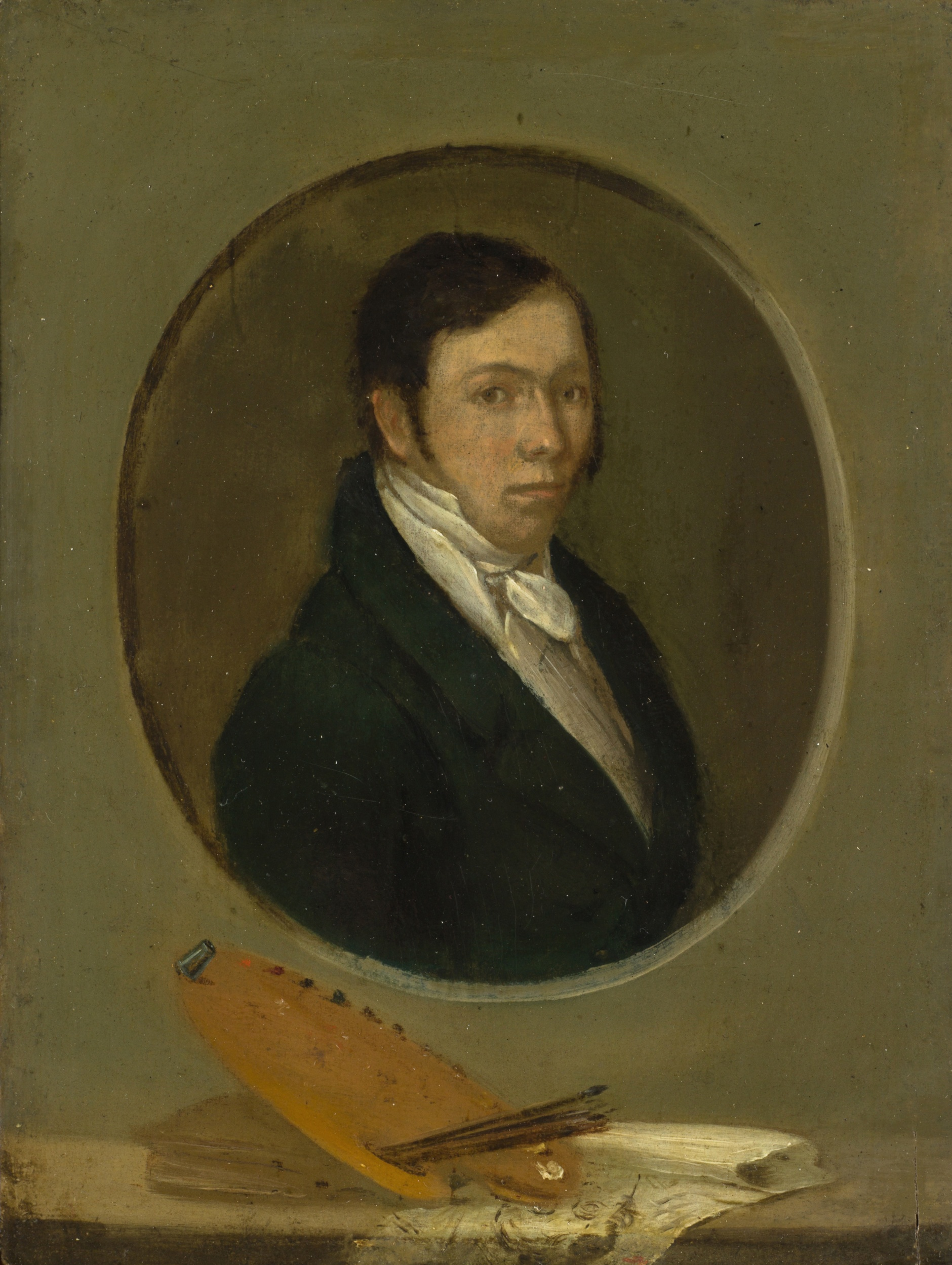
- Born: 11 August 1793; Basel, Switzerland
- Died: 27 September 1847 (aged 54); Basel, Switzerland
- Known for: Landscape painting and drawing
- Spouse: Juliane Vischer
- Relatives: Peter Birmann (father)

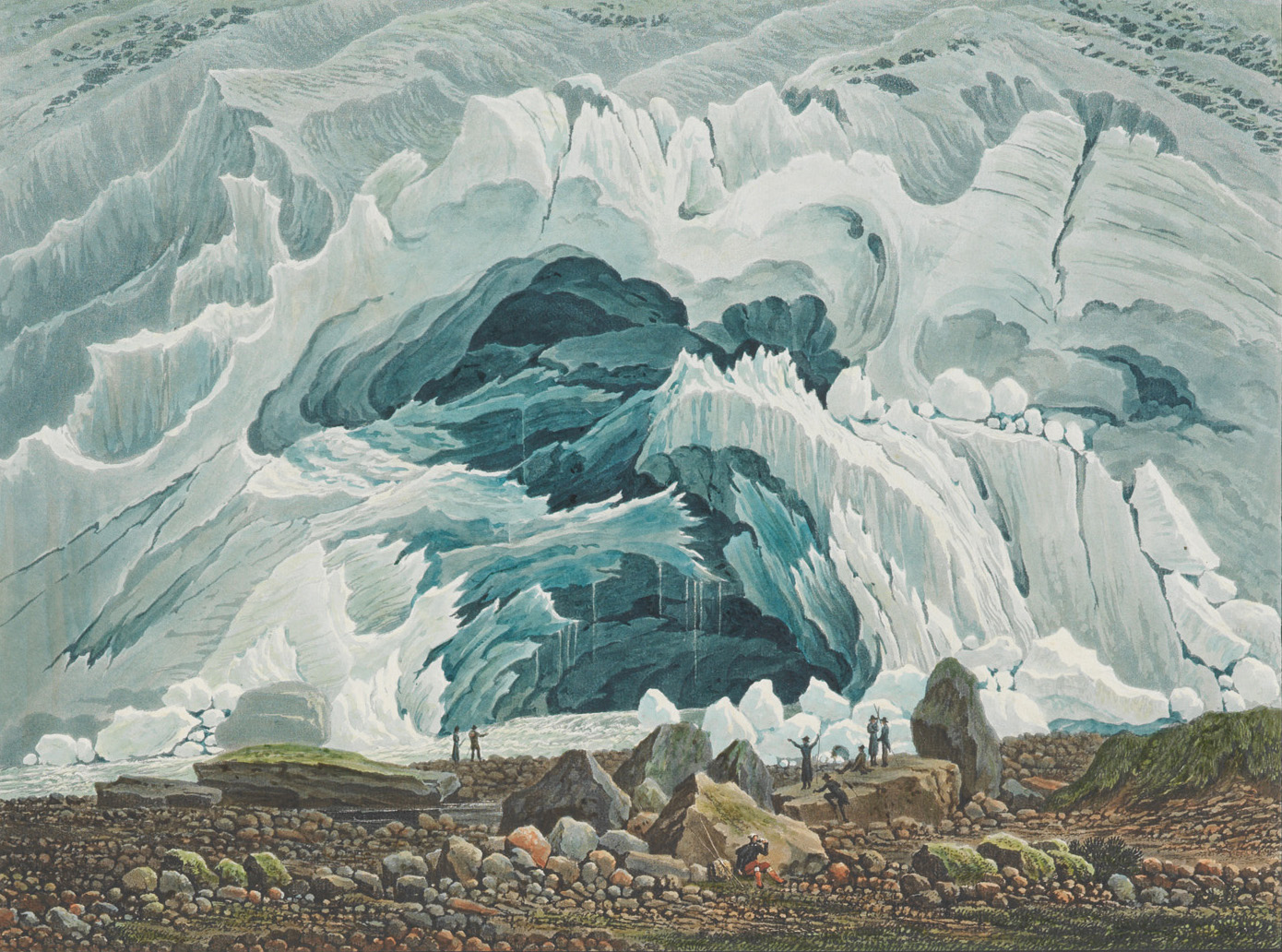
Source de L'Arveron

Samuel Birmann (11 August 1793 – 27 September 1847) was a Swiss landscape painter. He exhibited in Bern and Zurich between 1819 and 1821, and one of his works was shown at the Paris Salon of 1822. In 1844 he left part of his fortune to Basel’s public art collection, and his bequest later funded an acquisitions programme for contemporary Swiss art.

== Biography ==
Birmann was born on 11 August 1793, in Basel, the son of the painter Peter Birmann. In 1807 and 1808, he lived in Valangin, which is part of Romandy. He trained with his father and travelled through Switzerland in 1810 with the geologist Peter Merian. By 1811 he and his brother Wilhelm were working in their father’s business, and in 1812 he took part in the founding of the Basler Künstlergesellschaft.

From 1815 to 1817, Birmann worked in Rome in the studio of Martin Verstappen. He returned to Basel in late 1817 after his father called him back to the expanding family art business. In 1822 and 1823 he was in Paris with his brother. He married Juliane Vischer in 1825.

In the 1830s, Birmann increasingly suffered from a manic-depressive illness that restricted his artistic work. He later turned to business ventures, including involvement in the founding of the Swiss Northern Railway.

In 1844, Birmann left half of his fortune to the public art collection in Basel and half to social institutions. His bequest established a fund to purchase contemporary Swiss art for Basel’s public art collection, laying the foundation for an acquisitions programme launched in 1855. He died on 27 September 1847, aged 54, in Basel, following a period of mental illness.

== Work ==
Birmann was a landscape artist and painter. He worked in Basel and its surroundings, as well as in Italy and the Swiss and Savoy Alps.

From Basel, Birmann took part in art exhibitions in Bern and Zurich between 1819 and 1821, and a work by him was shown at the Paris Salon of 1822. His work included panoramas, and in the 1820s the Bernese Oberland became a central subject of his work. He published the series Souvenirs de l’Oberland bernois and Souvenirs de la Vallée de Chamonix.

Birmann's work often focused on mountain landscapes and studies of trees, rock, water and moss. Many of his Alpine landscapes contain few or no figures, and his works are held by the Öffentliche Kunstsammlung Basel and the Kunsthistorische Sammlung in Liestal.
