= Johann Caspar Bosshardt =

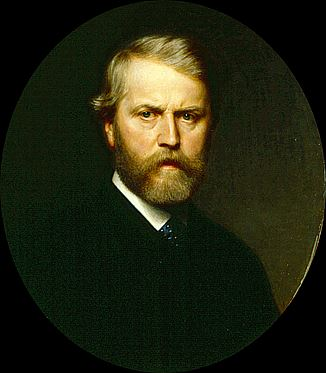
Self-portrait (c.1875)

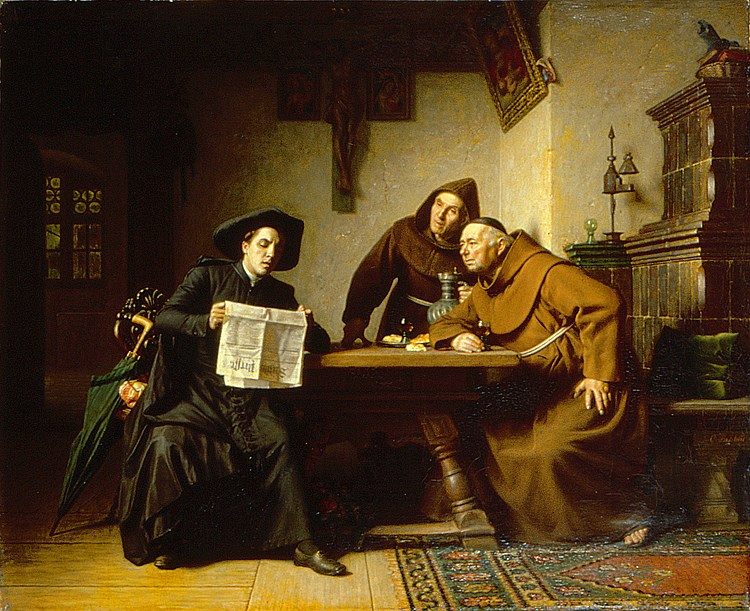
Politics in the Monastery

Johann Caspar Bosshardt, or Kaspar Boßhardt (1 April 1823, Pfäffikon - 10 February 1887, Munich) was a Swiss history painter who spent most of his life in Germany.

== Biography ==
His father was a cooper. Despite objections from his parents, he was finally allowed, at the age of fifteen, to go to Zürich, where he was apprenticed to the engraver, Georg Christoph Friedrich Oberkogler (1774–1855). Later, he studied portrait painting with Johann Rudolf Obrist (1809–1868).

He then obtained the sponsorship of Ludwig Vogel who, in 1841, recommended him to Theodor Hildebrandt for his classes at the Kunstakademie Düsseldorf. There, he came under the influence of Hildebrandt, Friedrich Wilhelm Schadow and Carl Friedrich Lessing.

Due to an unspecified nervous disorder, he had to quit the Akademie in 1844 and return home to recover. When he had improved, the government of Zürich granted him a scholarship to study history painting in Munich. He moved there in 1845 and, due to the disturbances surrounding the Sonderbund War and its aftermath, he decided to stay. He would remain for the rest of his life, although he travelled extensively and often visited Switzerland on business.

== Career ==
In 1847, he completed his first historical scene, depicting Hans Waldmann saying goodbye to his fellow prisoners. The painting was purchased by the Cantonal government of Zürich and was displayed at a major exhibition of the Schweizerischer Kunstverein (Artists' Association).

He continued to create large historical scenes, primarily from the 16th century, but most of his income was derived from portraits. He had hoped to receive a major commission for decorations in the new Federal Palace of Switzerland but, in 1865, his proposals were rejected. As a result, in the early 1870s, he turned to genre painting and travelled throughout Tyrolia doing study sketches. In his final years, he became reclusive.

After his death, his work was considered old-fashioned and was largely forgotten until a major retrospective was held for his centennial in 1987.
