= Paul Usteri =

Swiss physician, botanist, publicist and politician

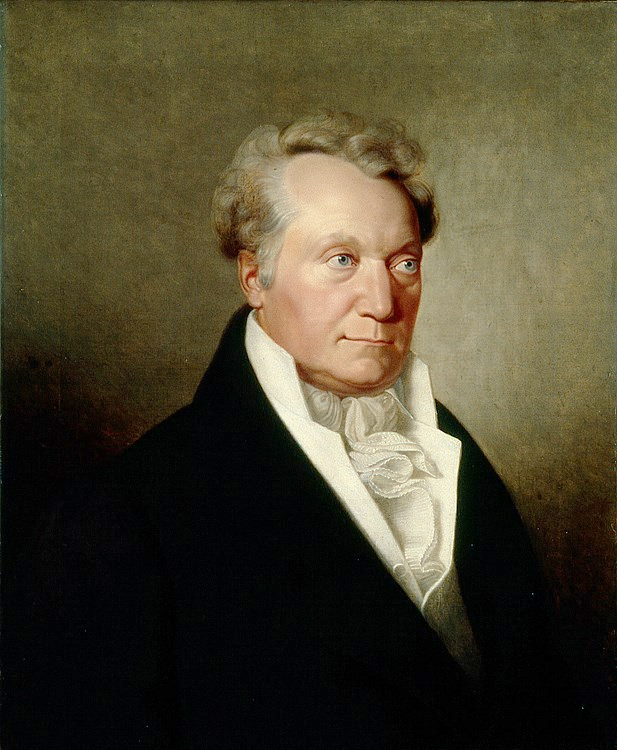
Paul Usteri (c.1820), portrait by Hans Jakob Oeri

Paul Usteri (14 February 1768, Zurich – 9 April 1831, Zurich) was a Swiss medical doctor, botanist, publicist and politician.

In 1788 he received his medical doctorate from the University of Göttingen, afterwards working as an instructor at the Zurich medical institute (1789–1798). During this time period, he was also overseer of the botanical garden for the Naturforschenden Gesellschaft in Zürich (Society of Natural Sciences in Zurich). During the French Revolution, his interests turned to politics — from 1797 until his death in 1831, he held various government offices in Switzerland. In 1801 he was named president of the Helvetian legislative council.

In 1787, with Johann Jakob Römer, he founded the botanical journal "Magazin für die Botanik". In 1790 he published the treatise "Delectus opusculorum botanicorum". As a taxonomist he circumscribed the plant genus Biondea (family Elaeocarpaceae). In 1793, the genus Usteria (family Scrophulariaceae) was named in his honor by Antonio José Cavanilles.
