= Jakob Christoph Miville =

Swiss painter and lithographer

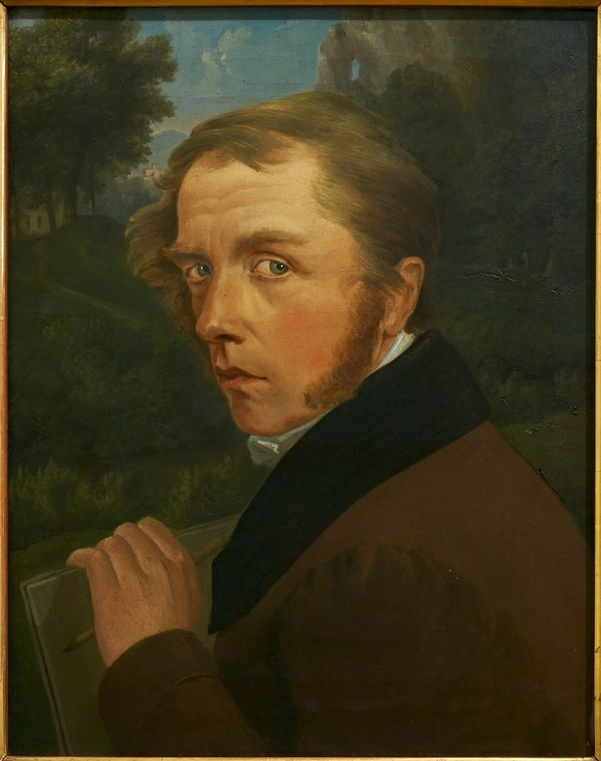
Self-portrait (1821)

Jakob Christoph Miville (18 November 1786, Basel - 29 June 1836, Basel) was a Swiss painter and lithographer; specializing in landscapes and portraits.

== Biography ==
He was born to Johann Jakob Mieville, a wealthy silk manufacturer, and his wife Margareta née Lotz. His studies began in Basel, with his drawing teacher, Peter Birmann. He then went to Zürich, where he studied painting with Johann Caspar Huber.

He found himself drawn to Rome, where he made contact with other German-speaking artists there, including Johann Christian Reinhart and Joseph Anton Koch, who had a major influence on his style. From 1805 to 1807, he focused on painting from nature and made landscapes his specialty. Upon returning to Switzerland his paintings received good reviews but, due to the unsettled political situation, failed to achieve economic success.

In 1809, he moved to Russia, hoping to find influential patrons, and settled in St. Petersburg. He went to Moscow in 1810, to enter the service of Count Grigory Orlov, who was then Chief Intendent of the Imperial State Forests. He was sent to survey new provinces in the Baltic region and Finland; providing topographical studies as well as drawings. After two years, he returned to St. Petersburg to take a position as a drawing teacher, at a private boarding school operated by Pastor Johannes von Muralt, a fellow Swiss emigrant. From 1814 to 1817, he travelled through Crimea and the Caucasus, making drawings and sketches.

He returned to Basel in 1816, where he once again encountered positive criticism, but poor sales. As a result, he began using his sketches to create Russian landscape paintings for the nobility of St. Petersburg. In 1819, he was able to sell a series of forty paintings on Crimean motifs to Countess Anna Vladimirovna Bobrinskaya.This financed a second stay in Rome, from 1819 to 1821.

Despite this, he failed to achieve financial stability until 1826, when he took a position as a drawing teacher at the non-profit Gesellschaft für das Gute und Gemeinnützige. His last years were saddened by the deaths of his wife and two children.

== Selected paintings ==
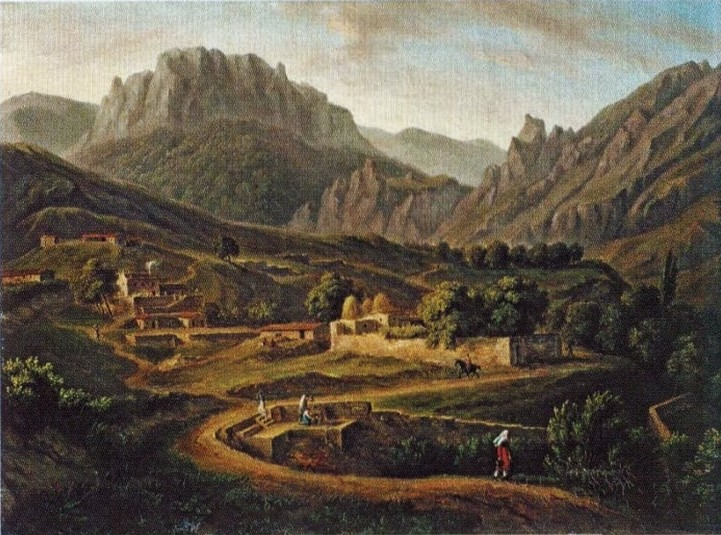
View of a village in the Koz Valley

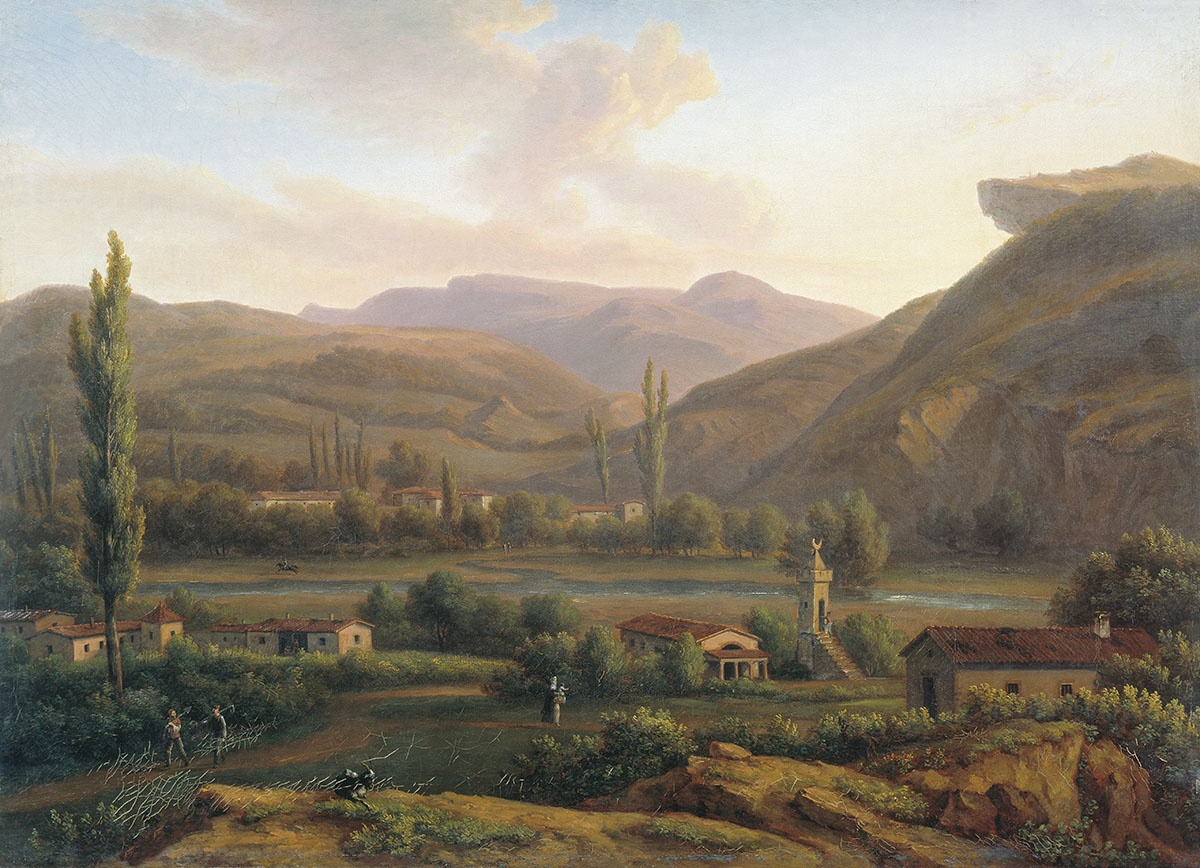
View of a Tatar village and mosque on the banks of the Alma

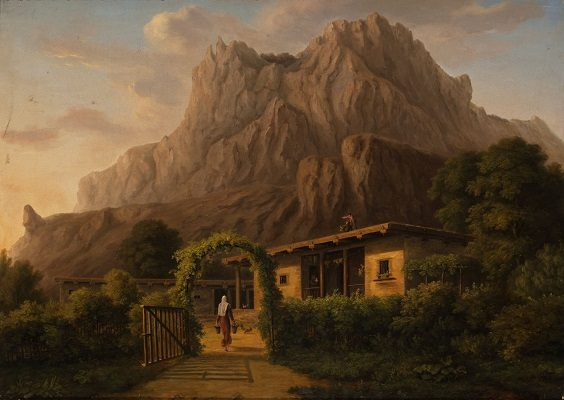
View of Ai-Petri

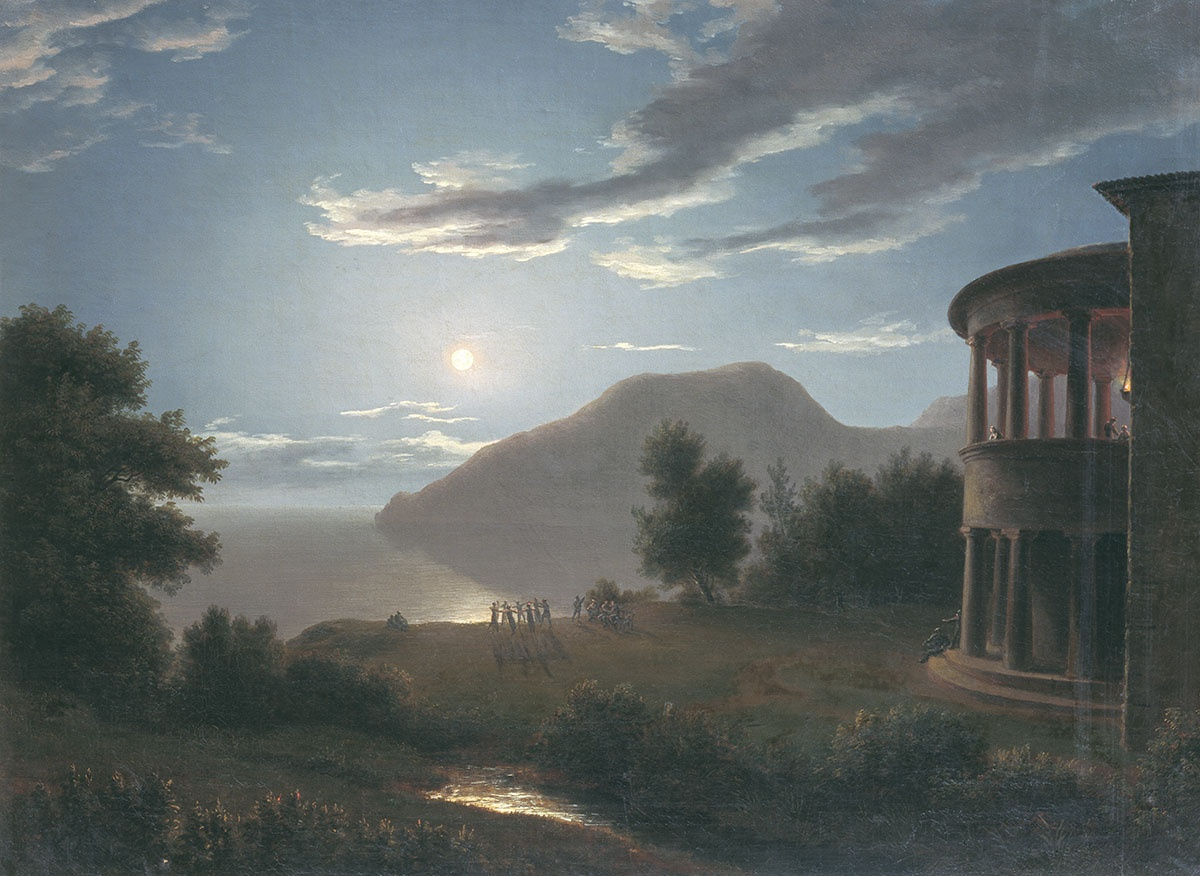
Moonlit Night in Kuchuk-Lambat
