= David Sulzer (painter) =

Swiss painter (1784–1864)

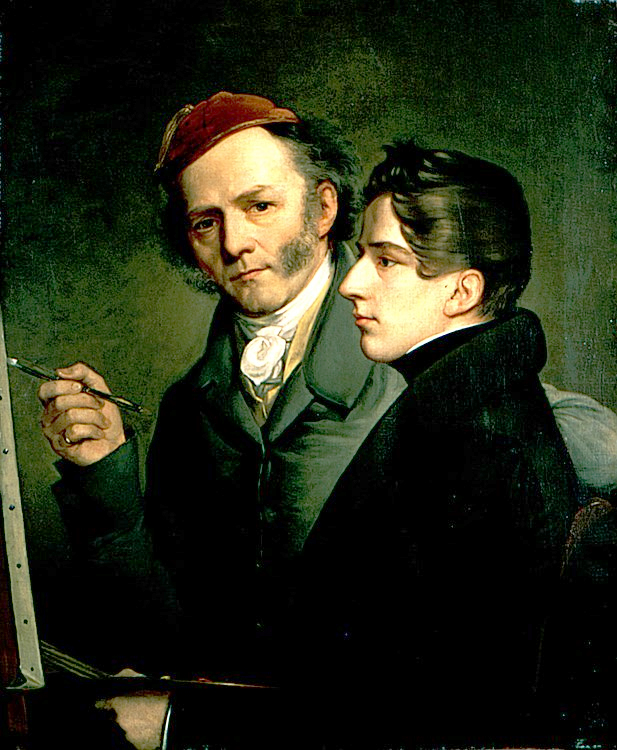
David Sulzer and his son, Julius Karl Emil Sulzer (Double self-portrait, c.1850)

David Sulzer (9 September 1784, Winterthur - 14 September 1864, near Münsterlingen) was a Swiss portrait and genre painter.

== Life and work ==
His father, Christoph, was a Master wheelwright and swordsmith. After taking drawing lessons at a local school, he trained as a painter in Zürich and Bern. In 1803 he, Hans Jakob Oeri, and some other friends took a trip to Paris, where he copied works by the Old Masters and trained in the studios of Jacques Louis David for eight years. Despite David's influence, decided to devote himself almost entirely to portraits.

After that, he worked in Bern and Winterthur, where he did portraits of the members of notable bourgeois industrial families. In 1815, he travelled to Austria to portray the elite personalities who participated in the Vienna Congress.

In 1817, he entered the nobility by marrying Franziska Katharina Freiin von Lütgendorff-Leinburg (1787 - 1862), with whom he had four sons. Their eldest, Julius Karl Emil Sulzer, also became a portrait painter.

Over the course of his career, he made a substantial fortune, but lost it after investing in a country estate in Weinfelden in 1852. He died in poverty at the age of eighty.

Many of his most notable works are in the collection of the Kunstmuseum Winterthur, although the majority of his approximately 1,000 canvases are in private collections. Some of his later works, in their background designs, show the influence of early Daguerrotypes. No solo exhibition has ever been devoted to him although, in the early 1900s, some showings prominently presented his works with other Swiss painters.

== Sources ==
- "Sulzer, David". SIKART Lexicon on art in Switzerland.
- "Sulzer, David" in German, French and Italian in the online Historical Dictionary of Switzerland.
