= Ludwig Vogel =

Swiss history painter

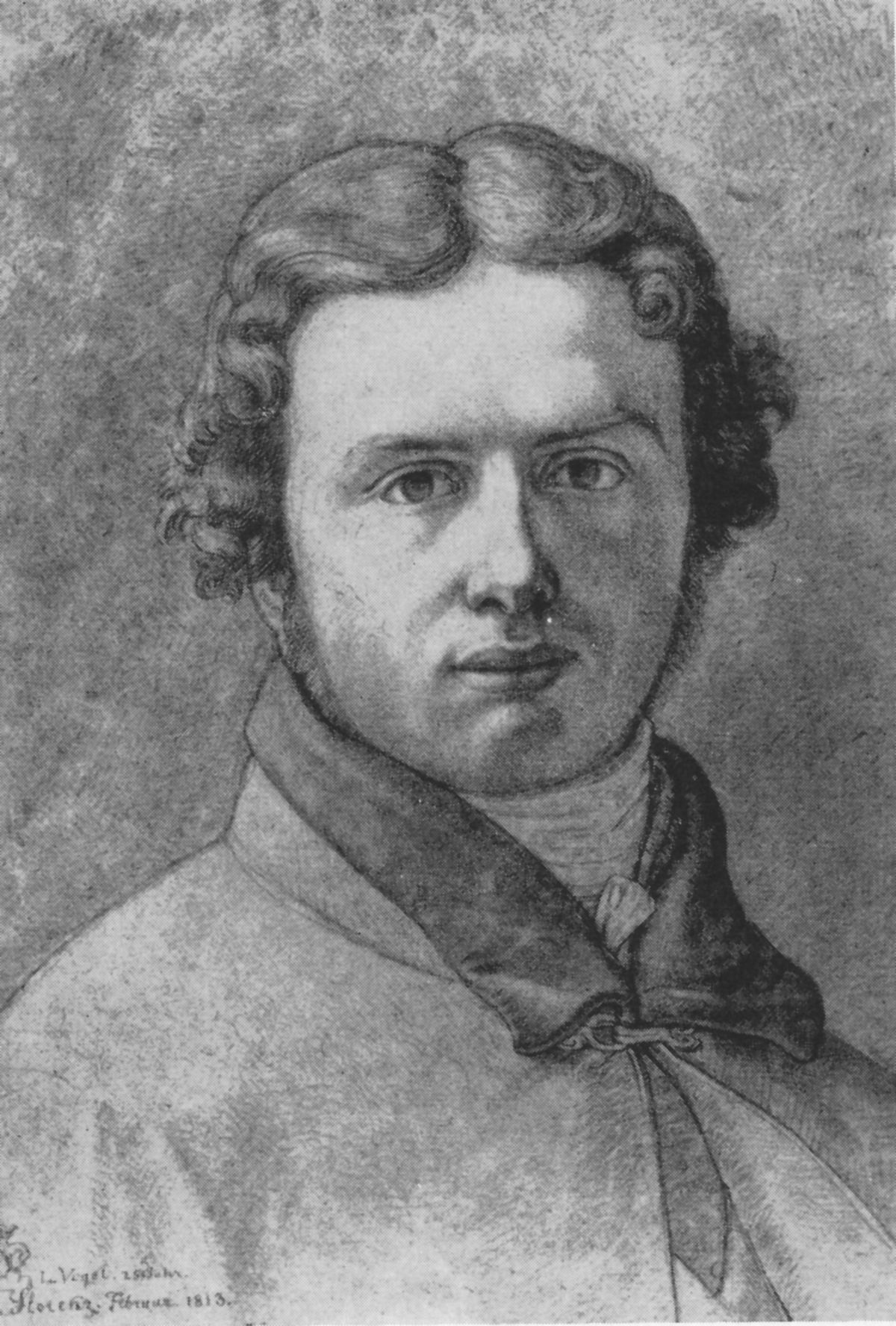
Self-portrait (1813)

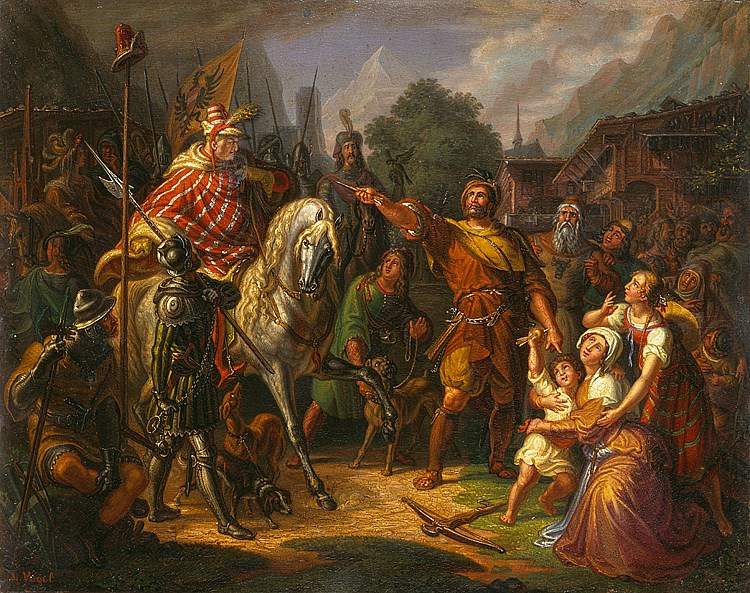
William Tell and the Apple (1829)

Georg Ludwig Vogel (10 July 1788, Zürich - 21 August 1879, Zürich) was a Swiss history painter, associated with the Nazarene movement.

== Biography ==
He originally followed in his father's footsteps and became a confectioner. He had, however, shown an early aptitude for drawing, which was supported by his family, and began receiving lessons as early as 1794. Later, even though he had not yet made a final decision to be an artist, he studied with Henry Fuseli (one of his father's customers) and Hans Jakob Oeri. None of them became major influences on his style. In 1808, after travelling about, he chose to enroll at the Academy of Fine Arts, Vienna, partly because Vienna was a major center for the confectionery trade, if painting did not work out.

While there, he was more influenced by his classmates, such as Franz Pforr and Friedrich Overbeck, than by his instructors. Becoming increasingly dissatisfied with his course of study, he joined the Brotherhood of St.Lucas, which was opposed to "academic trivia and manners". By 1810, its members felt they had been "virtually expelled" and submitted their resignations.

That year he, Pforr, Overbeck and Konrad Hottinger (1788-1828) decided to make a journey to Rome, where he became part of a group that included Bertel Thorvaldsen, Joseph Anton Koch and Peter von Cornelius, and came under the influence of the Quattrocentists. Efforts by Overbeck to convert him to Catholicism were, however, rejected. He soon painted his first full-scale canvas, depicting the return of Swiss forces from the Battle of Morgarten. After spending some time in Naples, Florence and Milan, he returned home.

Once there, he established a studio in a home his father had acquired in Upper Schönenberg that had formerly belonged to Johann Jakob Bodmer. He then produced a series of paintings portraying the folk life and history of Switzerland; an activity he continued into the 1860s. One of the best known, dealing with the Rütlischwur of 1307, was made into a popular engraving by Carl Arnold Gonzenbach. In 1818, he married a sister of the portrait painter, David Sulzer. They had ten children, but only three survived him. During these years, he did little else but paint and make an occasional trip to organize exhibitions, especially to Stuttgart and Milan.

He later became the patron of the Swiss history painter, Johann Caspar Bosshardt who, with his assistance, was able to enroll at the Kunstakademie Düsseldorf and study with Theodor Hildebrandt.

Most of his works are in private collections. A major retrospective was held by the Zürich Artists' Society in 1881.

== Sources ==
- Carl Brun (1896). "Vogel, Ludwig" . Allgemeine Deutsche Biographie (in German). Vol. 40. Leipzig: Duncker & Humblot. pp. 116–120.
- "Vogel, Ludwig (Georg Ludwig)" in German, French and Italian in the online Historical Dictionary of Switzerland.
