= Matthias Pfenninger =

Swiss artist (1739–1813)

Matthias Pfenninger (1739 – 1813) was a Swiss draftsman and engraver.

Around 1757 Pfenninger became a pupil with Johann Rudolf Holzhalb in Zurich, then with Emmanuel Eichel in Augsburg. After the apprenticeship he went to Paris, where he created copperplates for Philipp Jakob Loutherbourg the Elder and Christian von Mechel.

After returning home to Switzerland, he created views of Swiss attractions for Johann Ludwig Aberli and the Bernese book printer and publisher Abraham Wagner. After 1770 he created as a freelance artist engravings with Swiss landscapes and portraits of well-known people.

== Gallery ==
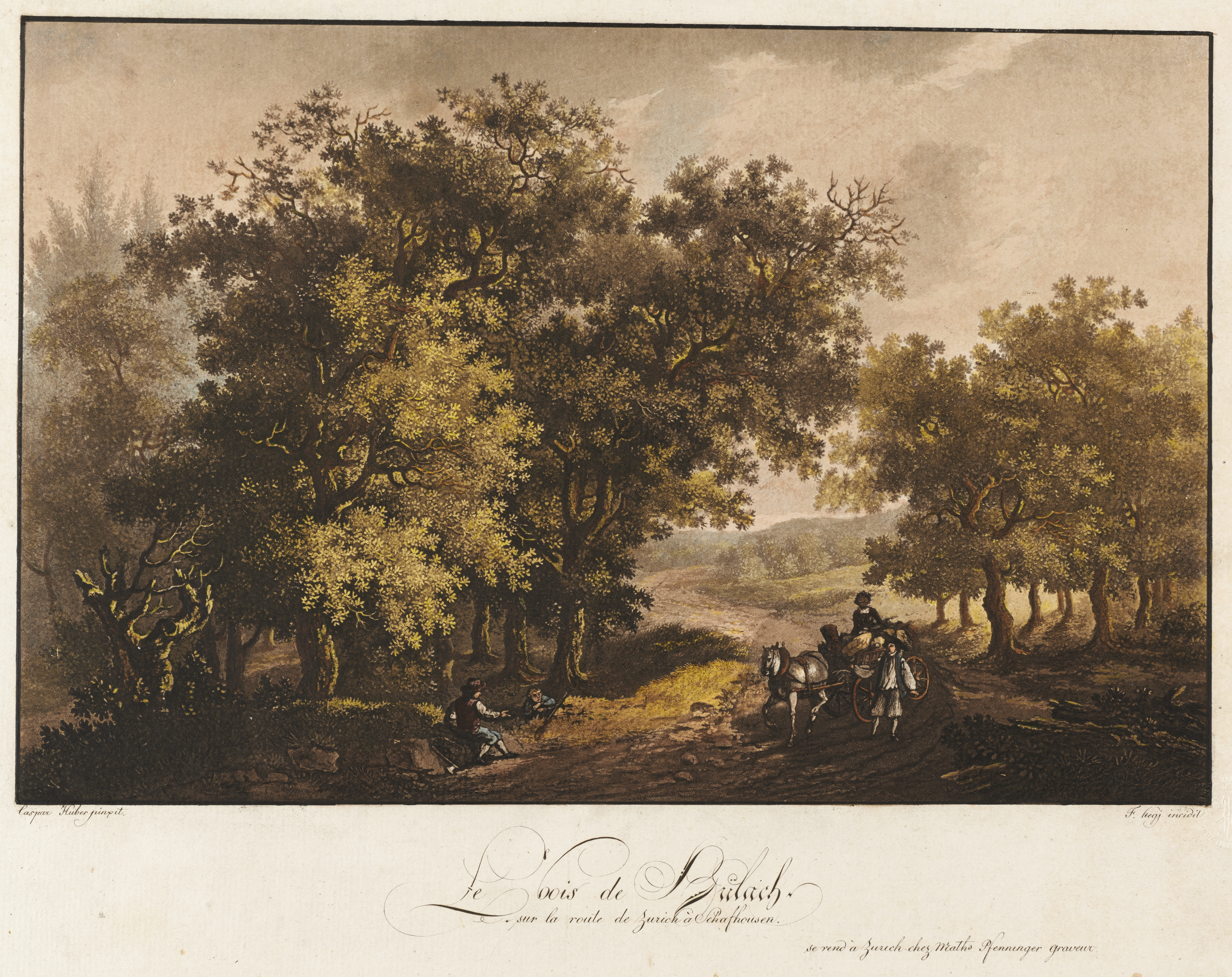

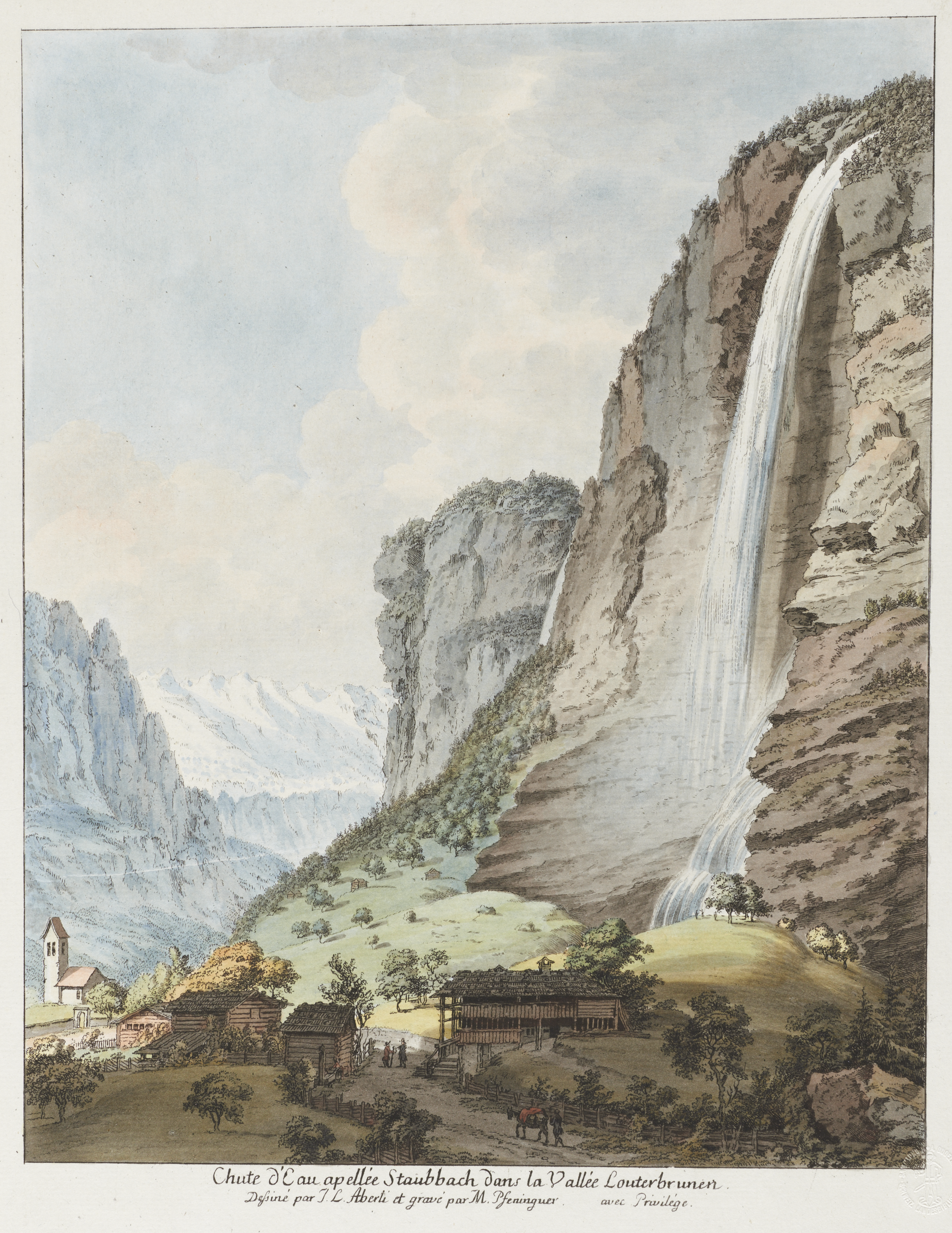

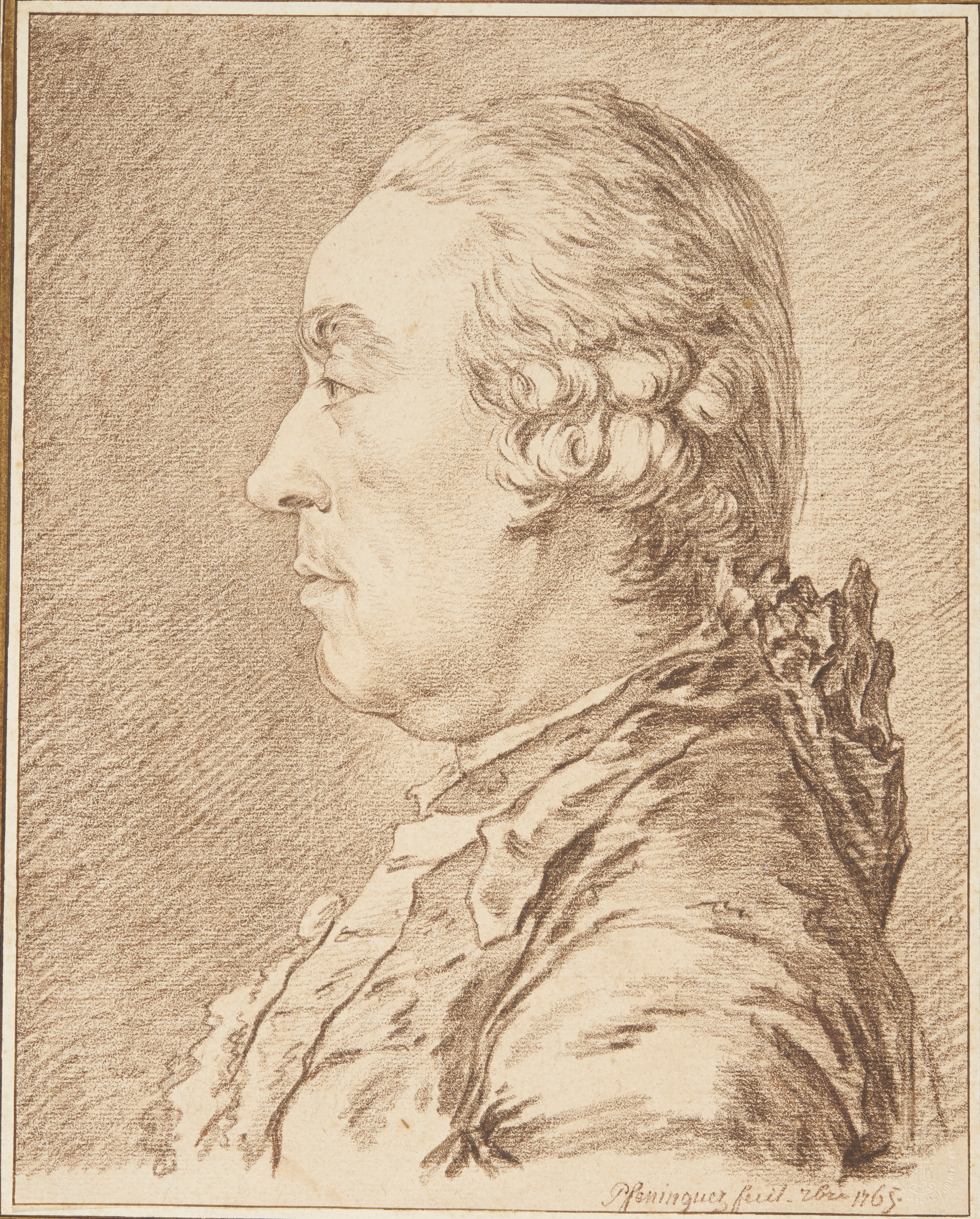

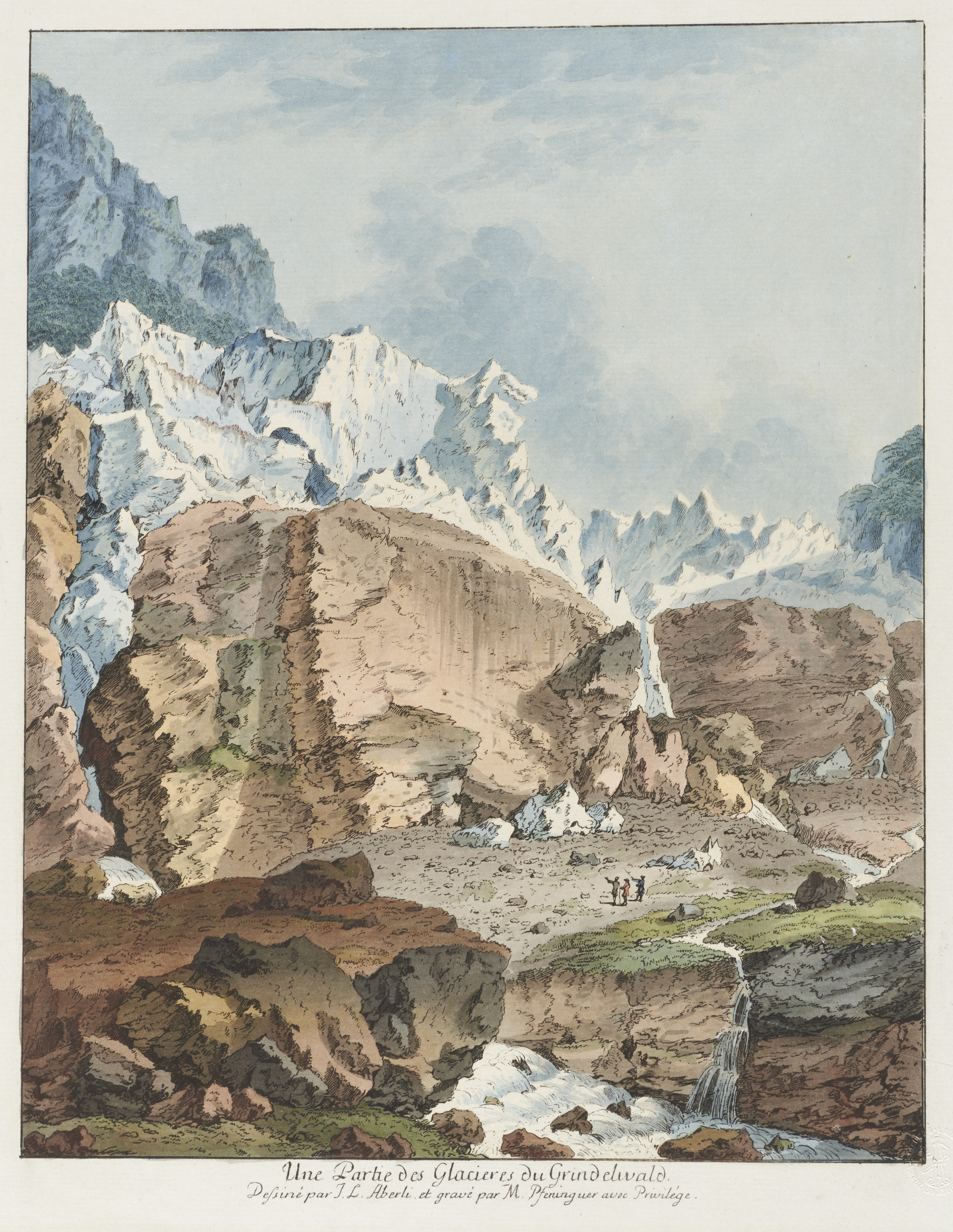

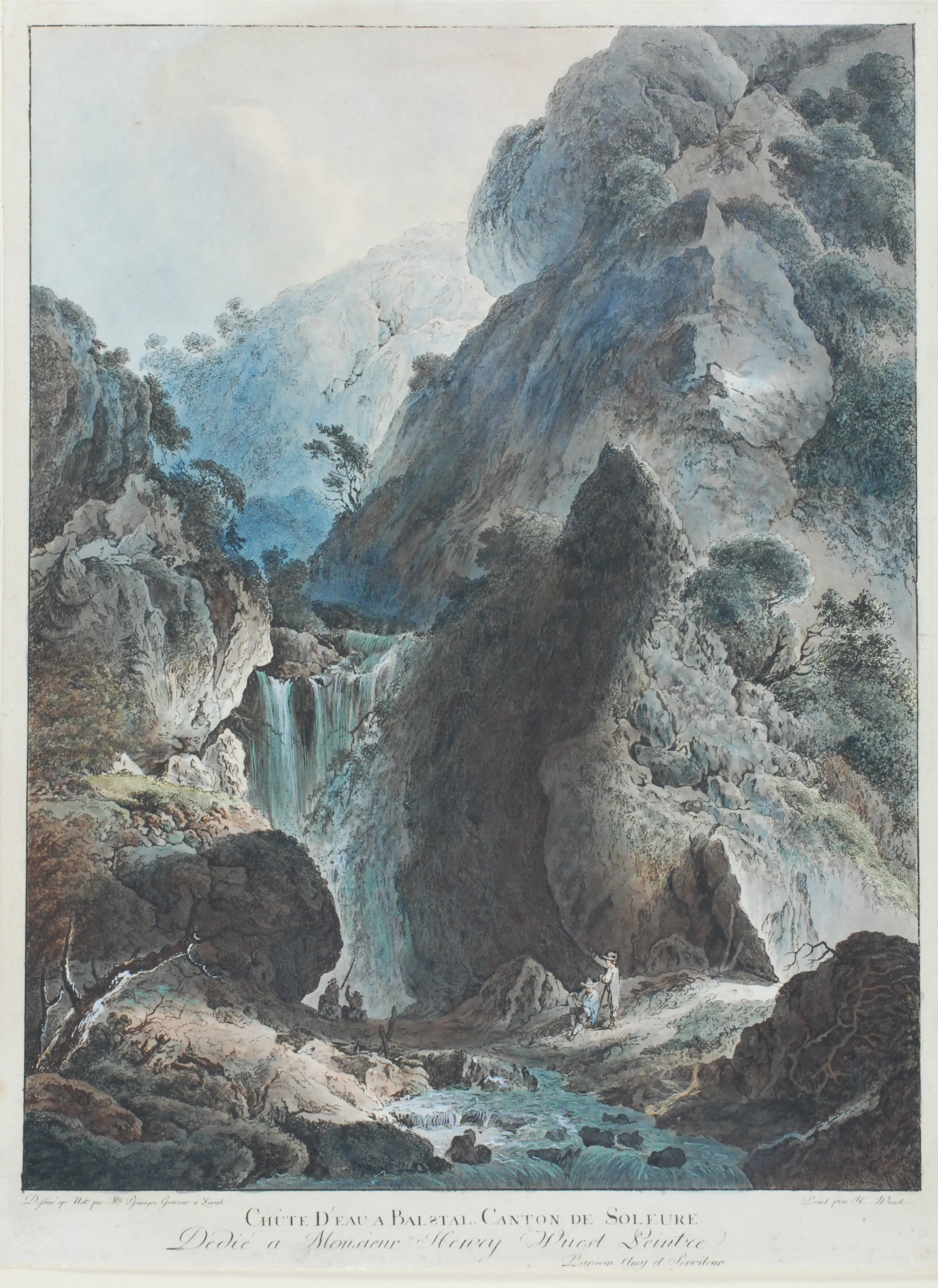
