= Carl August Gonzenbach =

Swiss merchant and politician (1779–1851)

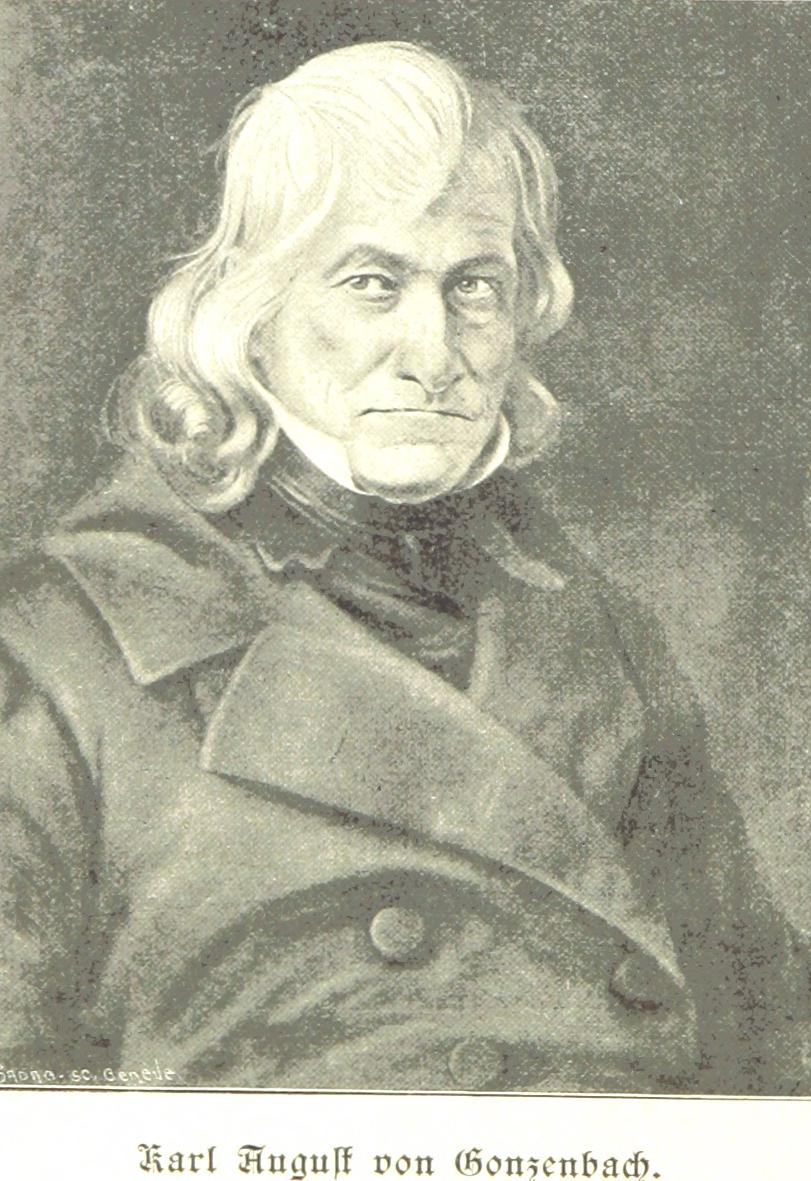
- Portrait in Die Schweiz im neunzehnten Jahrhundert, vol. 3
- Born: 13 February 1779; St. Gallen
- Died: 6 May 1851 (aged 72); St. Gallen, Switzerland
- Occupations: Merchant, politician
- Spouse: Margaretha Elisabetha Vonwiller (m. 1806)
- Children: Carl Emil Viktor von Gonzenbach

Carl August Gonzenbach (13 February 1779 – 6 May 1851) was a Swiss merchant and politician from St. Gallen. A partner in the trading house of the Gonzenbach brothers, he was mayor of St. Gallen from 1831 to 1835, sat in the cantonal Grand Council from 1815 to 1845 and presided over the Commercial Directorate (Kaufmännisches Directorium) of St. Gallen. From 1833 he was the Swiss plenipotentiary for trade matters with the southern German states.

== Biography ==
Carl August Gonzenbach was the son of David Gonzenbach, a merchant and important art collector. In 1806 he married Margaretha Elisabetha Vonwiller, daughter of Laurenz Vonwiller, a merchant. He was the father of Carl Emil Viktor von Gonzenbach.

Gonzenbach was a merchant and a partner in the St. Gallen trading house of the Gonzenbach brothers (Gebrüder Gonzenbach). He was president of the city council (Stadtratspräsident) of St. Gallen in 1830–1831 and mayor (Gemeindeammann) from 1831 to 1835. From 1815 to 1845 he sat in the Grand Council of St. Gallen, over which he presided in 1832. In 1830 he was a deputy to the Federal Diet, and in 1830–1831 a member of the constitutional council (Verfassungsrat). From 1833 he was the Swiss plenipotentiary for trade matters with the southern German states, and from 1838 to 1849 he was a cantonal judge. He presided over the Commercial Directorate in 1829–1830 and from 1836 to 1851. He was strongly involved in the St. Gallen Relief Society (Hülfsgesellschaft). As a moderate, liberal-conservative politician, he sought a balance between extreme radicals and conservatives; he was successful at first, but became increasingly isolated.

== Bibliography ==
- A. Gonzenbach, Biographische Skizze über Herrn Präsident Carl August Gonzenbach von St. Gallen, 1853
