= Carl Arnold Gonzenbach =

Swiss painter (1806–1885)

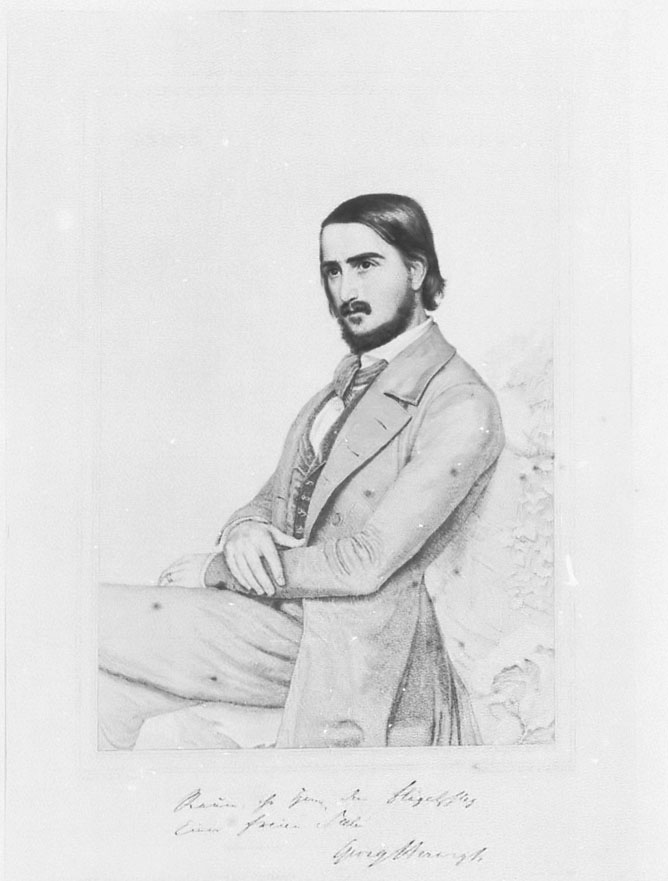
Georg Herwegh by Gonzenbach, Copperplate

Carl Arnold Gonzenbach or Carl Arnold von Gonzenbach (July 21, 1806 – June 13, 1885) was a Swiss painter and engraver. He worked as a portrait painter and gave drawing lessons. In addition to several oil portraits, Gonzenbach also produced cardboard and copper engravings of works by other artists.

== Biography ==
Gonzenbach was born on 21 July 1806 in St. Gallen. He attended Johann Jakob Lips's painting school in Zurich from 1821 to 1825, then studied at the art academy in Munich from 1826, under Johann Heinrich Felsing and Samuel Amsler.

In 1828, he traveled to Paris, where he worked with François Forste. In 1831-32, he travelled to Italy. When he returned to St. Gallen, he worked as a portrait painter and gave drawing lessons. He lived in Munich from 1838 to 1848, until moving back to St. Gallen.

== Works (selection) ==
In addition to several oil portraits, Gonzenbach also produced cardboard and copper engravings of works by Wilhelm von Kaulbach, Julius von Schnorr, Bonaventura Genelli and Ludwig Vogel.

- Günther and Brunhilde
- Siegfried and Kriemhild, based on the work of Julius Schnorr
- The Death of Arnold von Winkelried
- The Oath on the Rütli
- The Tell Shot, based on the work of Ludwig Vogel
- The Criminal from Lost Honor, based on the work of Wilhelm von Kaulbach
- The Saxon Art Association and its members (1847)
- Christ Praying
- Five sheets “From the Life of a Witch”
- Four sheets “From the Life of an Artist” based on the work of Bonaventura Genelli
- Two sheets on Shakespeare's Tempest, based on the work of Wilhelm von Kaulbach

Gonzenbach created three steel engravings for the Schiller Gallery based on models by Friedrich Pecht and Arthur von Ramberg. These were published in 1859.

Together with Alexander Rordorf, Gonzenbach created an illustration for Dante's Divine Comedy based on an oil painting by Carl Vogel von Vogelstein, which hangs in the Grand Ducal Palace delle Crociette in Florence.
