= Peter Birmann =

Swiss painter (1758–1844)

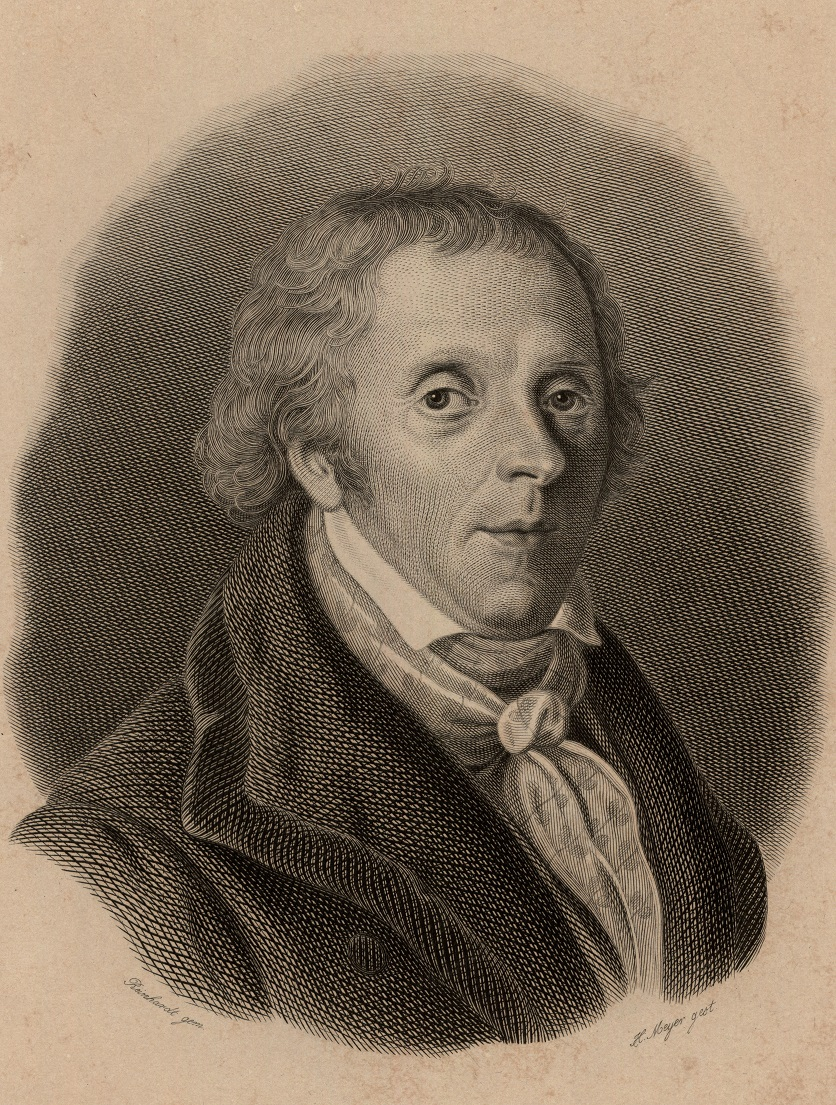
- Born: 14 December 1758; Basel, Switzerland
- Died: 18 July 1844 (aged 85); Basel, Switzerland
- Occupations: Painter, art dealer, publisher
- Known for: Landscape painting
- Children: Samuel Birmann, Wilhelm Birmann

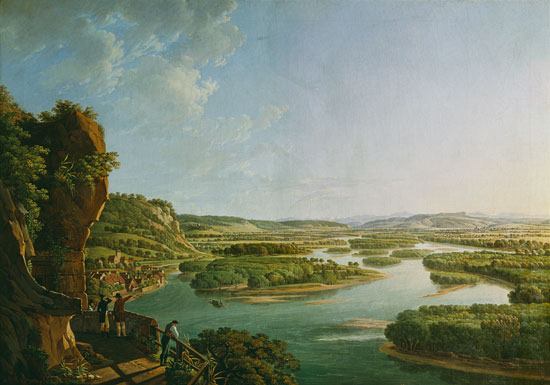
Peter Birmann: View from the Isteiner Klotz (c. 1800)

Peter Birmann (14 December 1758 – 18 July 1844) was a Swiss landscape painter, art dealer and publisher. After spending much of the 1780s in Rome, he returned to Basel, where he established a workshop and became a founding member of the Basel Artists' Society in 1812. His work included landscapes and views of Italy and Switzerland.

== Biography ==
Peter Birmann was born in Basel on 14 December 1758, the son of the stonemason Rudolf Birmann. After training with his father, he studied under Johann Ludwig Aberli.

From 1781 to 1790, Birmann lived in Rome, where he worked in the studio of Louis Ducros and later managed the engraving workshop of Giovanni Volpato. He became acquainted with Johann Wolfgang von Goethe during his time in Rome. He returned to Basel in 1790 after contracting malaria and the following year opened a workshop for decorative and fine painting, art dealing and publishing.

With the support of the Basel patron Johann Rudolf Burckhardt, Birmann travelled to Rome in 1781. The success of his watercolours and wash drawings among travellers from England, Germany and Russia enabled him to become self-employed in 1785.

In 1792, he married Dorothea Haag. He declined offers to relocate to Saint Petersburg in 1792 and 1795. In 1812, he became a founding member of the Basel Artists' Society. He served on Basel's Grand Council from 1804 to 1821 and on the Small Council from 1822 to 1831. His sons Wilhelm and Samuel Birmann also became artists. He died in Basel on 18 July 1844.

== Work ==
During his years in Italy, Birmann produced landscapes, architectural views, ruins, gardens and cityscapes in and around Rome. He was particularly drawn to the waterfalls of Tivoli and Terni, depicting them in watercolours, wash drawings and paintings.

After returning to Basel, Birmann continued to develop subjects first explored in Italy and also applied a classical landscape style to scenes from the Jura region. Influenced by the work of Claude Lorrain and seventeenth-century Dutch landscape painters, he produced landscape paintings, watercolours and drawings throughout his career.

== Legacy ==
In 1858, Peter Birmann's art collection and artistic estate passed to the Kunstsammlungen Basel through the will of his son Samuel Birmann.
