= Carl Emil Viktor von Gonzenbach =

Swiss merchant and politician (1816–1886)

- Lithograph from the Schweizerische Portrait-Gallerie, 1892
- Born: 14 February 1816; St. Gallen, Switzerland
- Died: 14 June 1886 (aged 70); St. Gallen, Switzerland
- Occupations: Merchant, politician
- Spouses: Henriette Charlotte Touchon; Dorothea Anna Maria Wetter

Carl Emil Viktor von Gonzenbach (14 February 1816 – 14 June 1886) was a Swiss merchant and politician from St. Gallen. He was regarded as an authority on questions of trade and industry, presided over the Commercial Directorate (Kaufmännisches Directorium) of St. Gallen from 1864 to 1886, and was a member of the National Council from 1878 to 1884. From 1874 to 1876 he was president of the Swiss Federation of Commerce and Industry (SHIV).

== Biography ==
Carl Emil Viktor von Gonzenbach was the son of Carl August Gonzenbach. He married first Henriette Charlotte Touchon, daughter of Carl Friedrich, from Neuchâtel, and second Dorothea Anna Maria Wetter, daughter of Caspar, a merchant and member of the citizens' council (Bürgerrat).

Gonzenbach trained as a merchant in St. Gallen, in Italy and in the Near East, and then became a partner in the trading house of the Gonzenbach brothers (Gebrüder Gonzenbach) in St. Gallen. From 1864 to 1886 he was president of the Commercial Directorate, and he acted as an expert on behalf of the Federal Council in the conclusion of trade treaties. He was regarded as an authority on questions of trade and industry. From 1874 to 1876 he was president of the SHIV.

From 1876 to 1882 Gonzenbach was a liberal-conservative member of the Grand Council of St. Gallen, and from 1878 to 1884 he sat in the National Council. He was a colonel in the General Staff.

== Bibliography ==
- E. Gruner, Die schweizerische Bundesversammlung 1848–1920, 1, 1966, 556–557
- Der Schweizerische Generalstab, 3, 74
