= David Eduard Steiner =

Swiss painter (1811–1860)

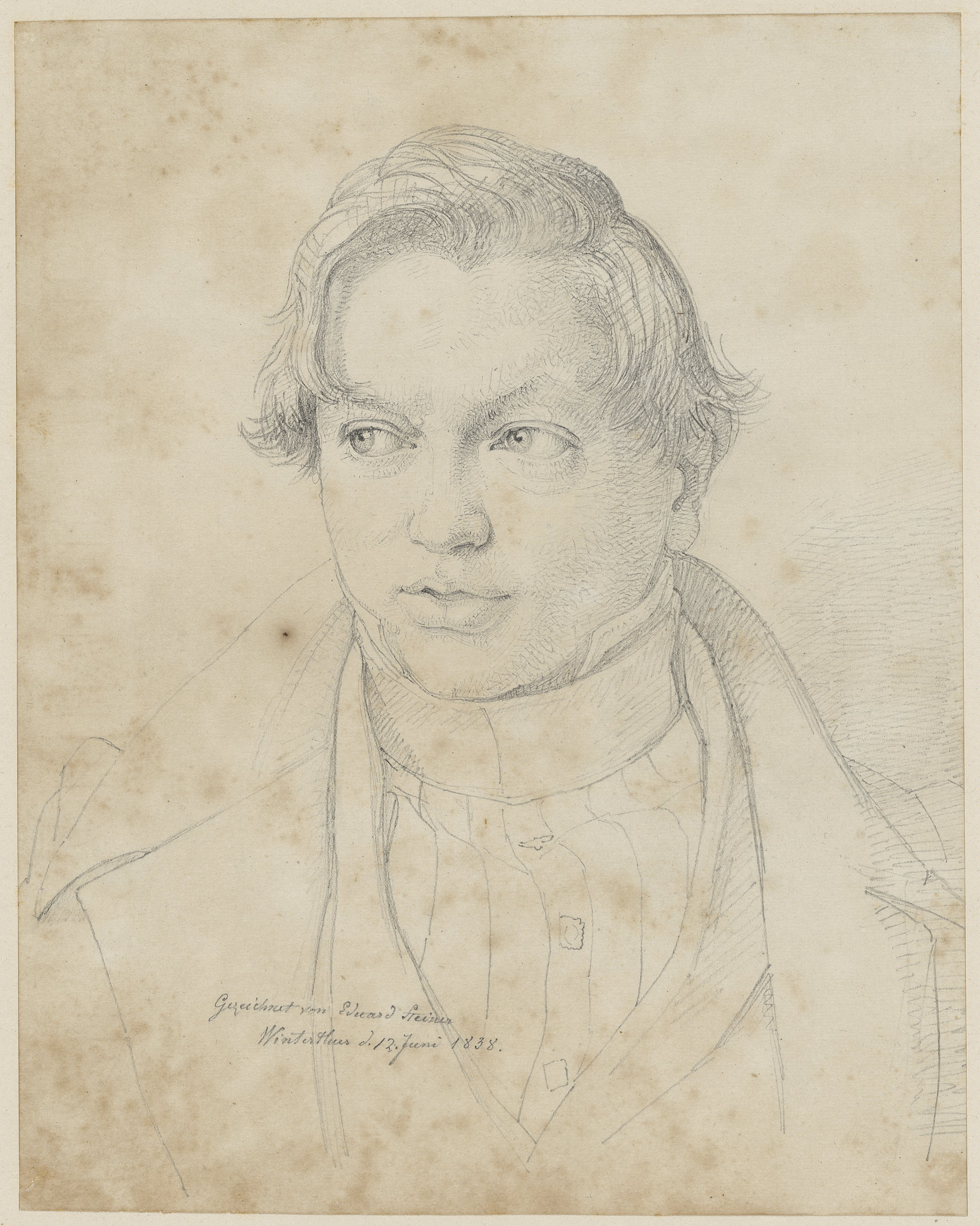
David Eduard Steiner, lithograph (1838)

David Eduard Steiner (7 April 1811, Winterthur – 5 April 1860 also in Winterthur) was a Swiss painter.

== Biography ==
He began studying painting under his father and continued his studies in 1829 at the Munich Academy. He returned to Winterthur in 1837.

He first started as a portrait painter, then in 1840, he devoted himself to painting history and landscapes. His works include the tableau entitled "Ulrich Zwingli shaking hands with Martin Luther as a sign of brotherly love" (1856) for the municipal library in Winterthur.

The Zentralbibliothek Zürich also has some of his works in their collection, as does the Kunstmuseum Winterthur.
