= Weidenmann =

Weidenmann is a German and Swiss surname. Notable people with the surname include:

- Alfred Weidenmann (1916–2000), German film director and screenwriter
- Bernd Weidenmann (born 1945), German psychology professor and author
- Jacob Weidenmann (1829–1893), Swiss-American landscape architect
- Johann Caspar Weidenmann (1805–1850), Swiss painter
