= August Weckesser =

Swiss painter (1821–1899)

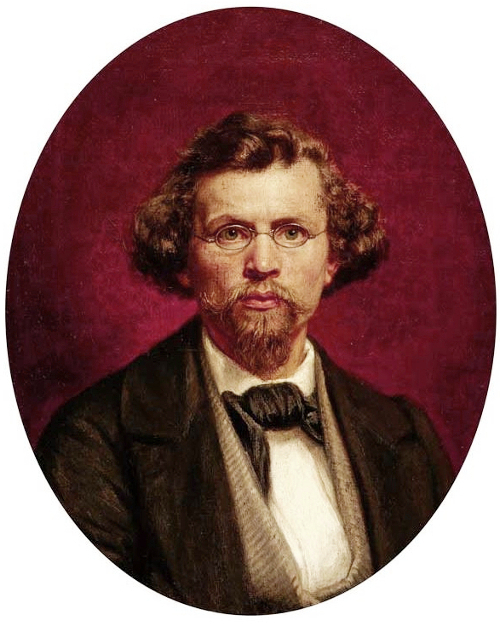
Self-portrait (date unknown)

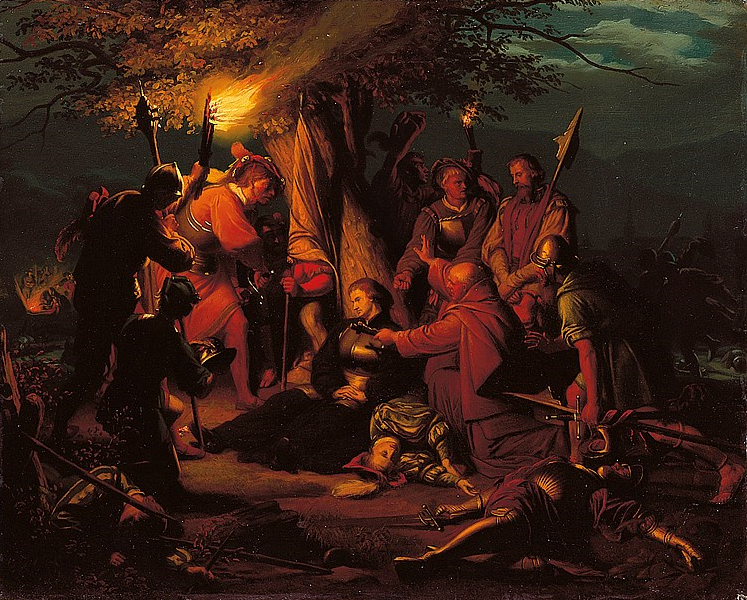
Zwingli's Death on the Battlefield at Kappel (1854)

August Weckesser (28 November 1821, in Winterthur – 11 January 1899, in Rome) was a Swiss painter, known primarily for history paintings.

== Biography ==
His father, Johann Christoph Adam Weckesser (1786–1834) was a miller, originally from Wertheim. His mother, Elisabeth Furrer (1799–1852), was the niece of Jonas Furrer, who would later become the Bundespräsident. While he was still a boy, the family moved to Oberwinterthur, where his father had taken over the operation of the local mill. At the age of fifteen, he left school to begin an apprenticeship there.

He apparently developed an interest in art because, at the age of nineteen, he began taking lessons from the portrait and history painter David Eduard Steiner. In 1841, contributions from local merchants enabled him to attend the Academy of Fine Arts, Munich. By 1843, he was able to open his own studio.

In 1848, he returned to Winterthur and took lessons from Johann Caspar Weidenmann. The following year, he received his first major commission; painting decorations above the bookshelves at the Knabenschule Winterthur (now the Museum Oskar Reinhart). Always seeking to improve himself, he later made study trips to Antwerp, Paris and Rome, although he remained attached to Munich. He never married.

Much of this was, again, financed by merchants who were sympathetic to the patriotic themes inherent in his work. Among his best known paintings are those depicting the death of Huldrych Zwingli, and Gertrud von Wart begging Agnes of Austria to have mercy on her husband, who was implicated in an assassination plot. The latter may be seen at Schloss Kyburg.

After 1858, Italy served as his second home. He died there in 1899, after suffering from a kidney ailment. Shortly after, a major retrospective of his work was held at the Stadthaus Winterthur.
