= Bernd Weidenmann =

Bernd Weidenmann (born January 22, 1945, in Tuttlingen) is an Emeritus Professor of educational psychology at the University of the Bundeswehr Munich and author.

== Works ==
- Erfolgreiche Kurse und Seminare - 2011
- Handbuch Active Training - 2008
- Workshops, Seminare und Besprechungen - 2008
- Die ï¿½berzeugende Prï¿½sentation - 2008
- Pädagogische Psychologie - 2006
- Gesprächs- und Vortragstechnik. Für alle Trainer, Lehrer, Kursleiter und Dozenten - 2002
- 100 Tipps & Tricks für Pinnwand und Flipchart - 2000
