= Von Bartha =

Swiss art gallery

von Bartha
- Industry: Art gallery
- Founded: 1970
- Founder: Miklos von Bartha; Margareta von Bartha
- Headquarters: Switzerland
- Owner: Stefan von Bartha
- Website: www.vonbartha.com

von Bartha is a Swiss contemporary art gallery owned and directed by Stefan von Bartha. Founded by Miklos and Margareta von Bartha in 1970, the gallery is one of the longest-running contemporary art galleries in the world and is managed by its second generation by Stefan von Bartha and his wife Hester Koper. Located in Basel and Copenhagen, the gallery represents established and emerging artists and estates of the 20th and 21st-centuries.

== History ==
=== 1970–1976: Schützenmattstrasse 26, Basel, CH ===
In 1968, Hungarian-born Miklos von Bartha met Swedish-born Margareta Lönn while studying graphic design under the direction of Swiss graphic designer Armin Hofmann at Schule für Gestaltung in Basel. After graduating they formed a close friendship with Hungarian art collector, gallerist, and publisher Carl László who encouraged them to become gallerists. They assisted Carl László at his Art Basel booth from 1970 to 1978. In 1970, Miklos and Margareta von Bartha established their own gallery “Minimax” in their home on Schützenmattstrasse 26 in Basel. The gallery's inaugural exhibition presented a group of artists, and was followed by a show dedicated to Italian artist Enzo Cacciola, a key figure in the analytical painting movement. Subsequent exhibitions highlighted the works of Swedish sculptor Christian Berg, Italian sculptor and designer Marcello Morandini, and German constructivist Thilo Maatsch. The gallery began publishing exhibition catalogues and artists monographs in 1971. In 1972, the gallery presented an exhibition dedicated to the French painter Yves Laloy, closely associated with André Breton and the Surrealist movement.

=== 1976–1982: Austrasse 126, Basel, CH ===
In 1976, the exhibition Hungarian Avantgarde received international recognition and included key figures like Lajos Kassák, László Peri, István Beöthy, Sándor Bortnyik, József Csáky, Lajos d’Ebneth, Alfred Forbát, Béla Kádár, and László Moholy-Nagy. The exhibition also included rare artworks by the Hungarian-French painter, engraver and crossdresser Anton Prinner.

In 1978, “Minimax” was renamed “von Bartha,” debuting at Art Basel under its new name. In the same year, an exhibition with Swedish artist Olle Baertling's work was presented along with the publication Baertling – Creator of open form, highlighting his importance for Scandinavian constructivism.

In 1979, twenty years after the original publication of Naked Lunch, American writer and visual artist William S. Burroughs gave a reading from the book at the gallery. The book was a tribute to the Beat Generation in Basel and New York. Accompanying the reading was the Dreamachine, which was updated specifically for the event with the help of Miklos von Bartha. Originally developed by British-Canadian engineer Ian Sommerville, painter and writer Brion Gysin, and William S. Burroughs, the Dreamachine, a work of light art, is a stroboscopic device that induces altered states of consciousness through flickering light patterns experienced with closed eyes.

=== 1982–2008: Schertlingasse 16, Basel, CH ===
In 1989, with the encouragement of Argentinian artist Martín Blaszko, Miklos von Bartha traveled to Buenos Aires to study two prominent Argentinian art movements from the 1940s and 1950s: Arte Concreto Invención and Arte Madí. The movements were influenced by the Zürcher Schule der Konkreten and artists such as Max Bill, Camille Graeser, Verena Loewensberg, and Richard Paul Lohse. During his visit, together with the German collector Christian Bernet, von Bartha acquired 180 works directly from the artists' studios, marking the gallery's international breakthrough with acquisitions by MoMA, Centre Pompidou, Musée de Grenoble, and the Guggenheim Museum.

In the mid-1990s, Miklos von Bartha met French constructivist painter Aurélie Nemours in her Paris studio, whose work became a cornerstone of the gallery's program. In 1993, the gallery hosted the first European exhibition of Arte Concreto Invención, followed by von Bartha's 1994 publication Arte Concreto Invención Arte Madí, now regarded as the definitive publication on South American concrete art.

Other solo exhibitions at the gallery were devoted to German artist Imi Knoebel, Swiss painter Camille Graeser, and German artist Gerhard von Graevenitz.

In 2016 the group exhibition Surrealism & Beyond, a special project curated by Margareta von Bartha, with works by René Magritte, André Breton, Yves Laloy, Man Ray, Marcel Jean, Otto Tschumi, Toyen, Hannah Höch, Scottie Wilson, Jindrich Styrsky, Wim Delvoye, Pierre Molinier, and Kurt Seligmann took place at Schertlingasse 16 in Basel.

=== 1996–2000: Bäumleingasse 20, Basel, CH ===
For four years, von Bartha ran a second gallery space on Bäumleingasse, a street known for its galleries, including Felix Handschin Galerie and Galerie Beyeler, run by renowned art dealers Ernst and Hildy Beyeler.

At just 16, Stefan von Bartha, the son of Miklos and Margareta von Bartha, curated his first exhibition at the gallery with an 800 Swiss franc loan from his parents. The exhibition showcased 420 vintage space toys.

In 1998, von Bartha presented sculptures and ceramics by British artist Barry Flanagan, followed by solo exhibitions of American artist Nancy Haynes and British artist Anna Dickinson.

=== 2006–2022: Somvih 46, S-chanf, CH ===
From 2006 to 2022, von Bartha operated a second outpost in S-chanf in the Engadin Alps. A white cube space, constructed by St. Moritz architect Hans-Jörg Ruch, situated in a former barn of an old patrician house, showcased site-specific installations. The new outpost was inaugurated with an exhibition, Rot-Weiss, by German artist Imi Knoebel. Further presentations were devoted to Ricardo Alcaide, Mike Meiré, François Morellet, Landon Metz, Karim Noureldin, Boris Rebetez, and Claudia Wieser, amongst others. In 2017, the Danish artist collective Superflex's “Hospital Equipment” installation was exhibited, raising awareness to supporting hospitals in conflict areas. A group exhibition, Unterschiedswesen, curated by Fabian Schöneich brought together works by artists such as Heidi Bucher, Julia Haller, Oliver Laric, Sam Moyer, Sarah Oppenheimer, and Danh Vo in 2019.

=== 2008–today: Kannenfeldplatz 6, Basel, CH ===
In 2008, Stefan von Bartha became director and owner of the gallery. The gallery opened a 700 m2 exhibition space at Kannenfeldplatz 6 in Basel, formerly a car wash and repair garage with an exterior petrol pump station, that is still in use today. The gallery was reimagined by Swiss architects Lukas Voellmy and Chasper Schmidlin, who later built Muzeum Susch in the Engadine for Polish entrepreneur and art collector Grażyna Kulczyk.

In 2009, Sarah Oppenheimer presented a work at Art Basel's Unlimited that could be experienced from within, creating an optical illusion of varying levels. This marked the American artist's first large-scale installation in Europe. Two years later in 2011, the gallery presented two major installations at Art Basel's Unlimited by artists Christian Andersson and Daniel Robert Hunziker. Also in 2011, two group exhibitions were on view at Kannenfeldplatz. Wall Floor Piece curated by Reto Thüring and Stefan von Bartha, brought together emerging artists such as Athene Galiciadis, Boris Rebetez, Karim Noureldin, and Pedro Wirz amongst others. Do Like Drawing, curated by Karim Noureldin showcased works by Alvar Aalto, Auguste Herbin, Terry Haggerty, Victor Vasarely, Henri Matisse, Laszlo Moholy-Nagy, Robertson Käppeli, and Aurélie Nemours. These were followed by presentations by French artist Bernar Venet in 2012 and 2014.

In 2013, von Bartha presented Swiss artist Sophie Taeuber-Arp’s untitled triptych from 1933 at Art Basel and it has since been exhibited, together with eleven more works that have gone through the hands of von Bartha's, as a part of the retrospective Sophie Taeuber – Arp: Living Abstraction at Kunstmuseum Basel, Tate Modern, and MoMA.

In 2015, the gallery presented Superflex solo exhibition Euphoria Now, and exhibitions with Swiss sculptor Bernhard Luginbühl. In 2017, an exhibition was devoted to German artist Adolf Luther’s work.

In 2020, von Bartha commemorated its 50th anniversary with the release of Est. 1950 and the exhibition The Backward Glance Can Be a Glimpse into the Future. The showcase honored the gallery’s legacy while looking ahead, featuring 44 modern and contemporary artists, ranging from László Moholy-Nagy to Claudia Wieser.

In 2021, the Imi Bar at Volkshaus in Basel was inaugurated, in which the German artist Imi Knoebel permanently installed colorful, stained-glass windows reminiscent of his Anima Mundi compositions.

=== 2021–today: Pasteursvej 8, Copenhagen, DK ===
von Bartha’s first international outpost opened in 2021 on in a former lighthouse in Carlsberg Byen’s Pasteursvej 8, Copenhagen. The exhibition program has focused on artists such as Claudia Wieser, Landon Metz, Andrew Bick, Marina Adams, Bob and Roberta Smith, Athene Galiciadis, Francisco Sierra, John Wood & Paul Harrison, Ursula Reuter Christiansen, and Terry Haggerty.

In 2022, the Municipality of St. Moritz unveiled a large-scale graphic installation titled WELCOME by American artist Barbara “Bobbie” Stauffacher Solomon along the shores of Lake St. Moritz. The installation was initiated by Serpentine Galleries and realized with the support of von Bartha.

In 2023, von Bartha began working with German-Danish artist Ursula Reuter Christiansen, presenting her work in Basel and Copenhagen, along with a presentation of her artwork Leporello at Art Basel's Unlimited. In the same year, Claudia Wieser created a monumental sculpture titled But Round My Chair the Children Run, which was featured in La Cinquième Saison by Paris+ par Art Basel, a group exhibition at the Jardin des Tuileries produced in collaboration with the Musée du Louvre. A retrospective of the work by Swiss artist Marianne Eigenheer (2023) was also presented at the gallery.

In 2024, Ursula Reuter Christiansen's first and largest retrospective exhibition I am Fire and Water was presented at Arken Museum of Modern Art. Art Basel named Francisco Sierra the winner of the first Unlimited People's Pick public prize, for his installation Guppy.

== Artists and estates ==
The gallery represents and features over 30 artists and estates, including:

- Caroline Achaintre
- Marina Adams
- Ricardo Alcaide
- Christian Andersson
- Olle Baertling
- Andrew Bick
- Olaf Breuning
- Anna Dickinson
- Marianne Eigenheer
- Barry Flanagan
- Athene Galiciadis
- Fritz Glarner
- Camille Graeser
- Gerhard von Graevenitz
- Terry Haggerty
- John Wood & Paul Harrison
- Imi Knoebel
- Yves Laloy
- Mike Meiré
- Landon Metz
- Felipe Mujica
- Aurélie Nemours
- Karim Noureldin
- Sarah Oppenheimer
- Anton Prinner
- Boris Rebetez
- Ursula Reuter Christiansen
- Francisco Sierra
- Florian Slotawa
- Bob & Roberta Smith
- Barbara Stauffacher Solomon
- Ted Stamm
- Superflex
- Sophie Taeuber-Arp
- Bernar Venet
- Claudia Wieser

== Publications ==
- Horizontal – Vertikal, Ein Aspekt Konstruktiver Kunst, exhibition catalog, Basel, Switzerland, 1977, von Bartha (publ.)
- Ungarische Avantgarde, exhibition catalog, Basel, Switzerland, 1977, von Bartha (publ.)
- Brunius, Teddy; Reutersvaerd, Oscar: Baertling, Creator of Open Form, Switzerland, 1978
- Eric H. Olson, Basel, Switzerland, 1980, von Bartha; Christel Gallery, Stockholm-Helsinki; Nordenhake Gallery Malmö (publ.), von Bartha (publ.)
- Lars Erik Falk, Basel, Switzerland, 1984, von Bartha (publ.)
- Yves Laloy – Paintings and Objects, 1948 – 1986, with essays by André Breton, Carl Laszlo, José Pierre, Basel Switzerland, 1989, von Bartha (publ.)
- Arte Concreto Invencion – Arte Madi, catalog to accompany the exhibition at Haus Konstruktiv, Zurich, April 26 - July 14, 1991, with essays by Margit Weinberg Staber, Nelly Perazzo, Tomás Maldonado, Basel, Switzerland, 1991, von Bartha (publ.)
- Arte Concreto Invencion - Arte Madi, with essays by Gabriel Pérez-Barreiro (The Negation of all Melancholy - Arte Madí/Concreto-Invención 1944 - 1950, first published in the catalog “Argentina 1920 - 1994, Museum of Modern Art, Oxford, 1994), 1994, von Bartha (publ.)
- Anna Dickinson, with an introduction by Dan Klein, Basel, Switzerland, 1997, von Bartha (publ.)
- Der Sturm – Die ungarischen Künstler am Sturm, Budapest, Hungary, 1998, von Bartha, Carl Laszlo (publ.)
- Schriftbilder Bilderschrift, Basel, Switzerland, 2004, von Bartha (publ.)
- The fascination with the mechanical, with essays by Astrid Bextermöller and Heinz Stahlhut, Basel, Switzerland, 2005, von Bartha (publ.)
- Anna Dickinson, with essays by Dr. André Wiese, Bettina Tschumi, Basel, Switzerland, 2007, von Bartha (publ.)
- Camille Graeser. Die Entwicklung einer Konstruktiv-Konkreten Bildsprache, Basel, Zurich, Switzerland, 2007, von Bartha, the Camille Graeser Estate (publ.)
- The Source of inspiration, Basel, Switzerland, 2009, von Bartha (publ.)
- Camille Graeser, with essays by Vera Hausdorff & Roman Kurzmeyer, Basel, Zurich, Switzerland 2014, von Bartha, the Camille Graeser Estate (publ.)
- Anna Dickinson, catalog to accompany the exhibition “Anna Dickinson - Harmony in Glass, Ariana Museum Geneva, June 12 - November 1, 2015, with an essay by Anna Moszynska, and an interview conducted by Ana Quintero Pérez Stanislas Anthonioz, von Bartha (publ.)
- Est. 1970, 50 years anniversary book, Basel, 2020, von Bartha (publ.)
- Barry Flanagan, with essays by Jo Melvin and Jonathan Bragdon, Basel, Switzerland, 2021, von Bartha (publ.)
- Marianne Eigenheer – A Lifelong Search Along the Lines, with essays by Marianne Eigenheer, Max Dax, Matylda Kryzkowski amongst others, London, United Kingdom, 2023, von Bartha, Black Dog Press, The Estate of Marianne Eigenheer (publ.)
- Marina Adams – Flower Power, exhibition catalog, with an essay by Helga Christoffersen, Copenhagen, Denmark, 2022, von Bartha (publ.)
- Marina Adams – To a World Full of Others, Basel, with an essay by Mareike Dittmer, Basel, Switzerland, 2024, von Bartha (publ.)

The gallery began publishing exhibition catalogues and artists monographs in 1971. From 2009 – 2020 von Bartha published the newspaper von Bartha Report, which later has been further developed into the online Magazine von Bartha Stories.
