= Adham Faramawy =

Artist

Adham Faramawy is an Egyptian artist, born in Dubai and based in London. Their work spans media including moving image, sculptural installation and print, engaging concerns with materiality, touch, and toxic embodiment to question ideas of the natural in relation to marginalised communities.

They have exhibited and screened their work internationally including at Guggenheim, New York, Tate Modern and Tate Britain, London, Whitechapel Gallery, London, ICA, London, Bluecoat, Liverpool, and Royal Academy, London. They presented a radio show on the body and immersive moving image for BBC Radio 4 in 2018, and were shortlisted for the Film London Jarman Award in both 2017 and 2021.

== Notable works ==
'The air is subtle various and sweet' (2020) - Voiced over by the artist the installation is a meditation on cultural belonging, the weight of personal history and the external forces that shape where we end up living.

'Proposal for a parakeet’s garden' (2022) - created for the exhibition ‘Testament’ at Goldsmiths Centre for Contemporary Art, Faramawy reflects on the experience of the migrant community by way of a metaphor. The film speaks about the introduction of and growth in number of parakeets. Despite their exotic plumage parakeets are classified as an invasive, feral species. The brightly colour parakeet is now a common sight in parks across the United Kingdom and Faramawy presents their presence as a metaphor for migrants, and more recently refugees, particular those who are people of colour who have come to Britain in increasing numbers in the last fifty years. In the short, four-minute film, Faramawy offers an alternative vision to designating the parakeets as invasive and instead suggests a monument for the displaced in the form of a garden.

'The heart wants what the heart wants' (2021) - Continuing their research into identity, bodies, desire and queering ideas of the natural, ‘The heart wants what the heart wants’ centres on entanglements within multi species ecologies, stories of migration, personal history and ideas of desirability, questioning the different ways a body, behaviour, movement or interaction might be desirable and when it or they might be unwelcome. Filmed at the Wanstead Flats in east London, the work is narrated by Faramawy, with performance and choreography in collaboration with Joseph Funnel, Fil Li and Omar Jordan Phillips. Supported and first exhibited by Art Night London, along with Near Now, Nottingham and Wysing Art Centre, Cambridgeshire.

'By earth, sea and air we came' (2021) - a video work intertwining the lives of flowers, parakeets and sailors around a river that flows through the periphery of a city, drawing on history, biology, geography and mythology to think through experiences of migration and the relationship the artist, as a migrant and a person of colour, has to ideas of the land and of place.” Filmed along the River Lea in east London, the work is narrated by Faramawy, with performance and choreography in collaboration with Joseph Funnel and Omar Jordan Phillips. Supported and first exhibited by Eastside Projects, Birmingham, as part of the exhibition LOOP, co-curated by Harold Offeh, alongside artists Phoebe Collings James, Will Walid Fredo, Keiken and Samra Mayanja.

'Skin Flick' (2019) - Takes the body as a starting point, using skin as a site to explore ideas of borders, boundaries, and fluid subjectivity. These ideas leak out into Faramawy’s wall-based works such as their series ‘The stickiness of an unclean break’ (2020).

== Select solo exhibitions and screenings ==
- 'The air is subtle, various and sweet', screening, Guggenheim Gallery, New York, 2022
- 'The air is subtle various and sweet', solo exhibition, Niru Ratnam Gallery, London, 2021
- 'Skin Flicks', screening, Tate Britain, London, 2019
- 'Janus Collapse', solo exhibition, Bluecoat, Liverpool, 2017
- 'Hydra', solo exhibition, Cell Projects, London, 2014

== Select group exhibitions and screenings ==
- 'All bodies Radiate Light', group screening, Tate Modern, London, 2022
- 'Queer Earth Liquid Matters', performance as part of symposium, Serpentine Gallery, London, 2022
- 'Back to Earth', group exhibition, Serpentine Galleries, London, 2022
- 'Testament', group exhibition, Goldsmiths Centre for Contemporary Art, London, 2022
- 'The shape of a circle in the mind of a fish: The understory of the understory', video premiere as part of symposium, Serpentine Gallery, London, 2020
- 'Mushrooms', group exhibition, Somerset House, London, 2020
- 'I’m here but you’ve gone', group exhibition, Fiorucci Art Foundation, 2015
- 'Until Recently I Only Had A Voice', symposium co-organised with Cecile B. Evans, Royal Academy, London, 2015
- 'Silica', two person exhibition with Celia Hempton, Galerie Sultana, Paris, 2013
- 'Abstract Cabinet', group exhibition, David Roberts Art Foundation, 2013

== Publications ==
- Synthetic Becoming, edited by Lenka Vesela, published by K. Verlag, Berlin
- Watch This Space, written by Francesca Gavin, published by Tenderbooks, London

== Select press ==
- 'What Is Hospitality in an Era of Crises?', HyperAllergic, 16 February 2023
- ‘Testament’ Questions the Moments We Memorialize' Frieze, 17 March 2022
- 'Flags, flowers and futurist film: the Jarman award shortlist – in pictures', The Guardian, 30 September 2021
- 'The Artists Building a Future out of Mushrooms' Frieze: Issue 218, 07 April 2021
- 'Under the influence: three artists on how Bruce Nauman continues to be an inspiration', The Art Newspaper, 2 October 2020
- 'Sites of resistance + sensuality: rolling in the mud of mixed feelings with Adham Faramawy', AQNB, 13 March 2017
- 'Adham Faramawy' Frieze: Issue 162, 18 March 2014
