= Eva Gold =

British visual artist (born 1994)

- Born: 1994 (age 31–32); Manchester, England
- Education: Goldsmiths, University of London
- Occupation: Artist

Eva Gold is a British visual artist (born January 1994).

== Early life and education ==
Eva Gold was born in Manchester in 1994.

In 2016, Gold graduated from Goldsmiths, University of London with a BA in Fine Art and History of Art. In 2019, she graduated from the Royal Academy Schools postgraduate programme.

== Work ==
Gold works across mediums including sculpture, moving image, drawing, writing, and installation. Themes explored in her work include power, pleasure, disgust, and violence.

== Career ==
In 2024, Gold's work you were disgusting and that's why I followed you featured in the Focus section at the Frieze art fair. The installation included a scene of a living room in which the viewer is led to believe a male voyeur is present in the space.

== Exhibitions ==
=== Solo ===
Year	Title	Institution	Location	Ref
2017	A Bead of Sweat, Stilled	Lily Brooke	London	
2018	Let me look at you	Centre for Recent Drawing	London	
2020	Parrhesiades: Perv City	Goldsmiths Centre for Contemporary Art	London	
2022	The Last Cowboys	Ginny on Frederick	London	
2022	Slow Dance	Eigen + Art Lab	Berlin	
2023	City of Rooms (Part 2)	Sadie Coles HQ / Rose Easton	London	
2024	Shadow Lands	Silke Lindner	New York	
2024	Acts of Violence	Rose Easton	London	
2025	To be Animal	Rose Easton	London	

=== Duo ===
Year	Title	With	Institution	Location	Ref
2018	Die Wohnung (The Dwelling)	Madeleine Pledge	SET Space	London	
2018	Room to Crawl	Lewis Hammond	Becky's	London	
2022	Eva Gold & Elisabeth Molin		Lock Up International	Brussels	
2023	City of Rooms (Part 1)		Rose Easton	London	

=== Selected group ===
Year	Title	Institution	Location	Ref
2014	Plan.Open. Neo Craft	Arebyte Gallery	London	
2014	In the City	Hanover Project	Preston	
2015	Disorientation	Mile End Park Pavilion	London	
2017	Bearing Liability	Strange Cargo	Folkestone	
2017	Minimum III'	Gesso Artspace	Vienna	
2018	Battery Horizons	Hockney Gallery	London	
2019	General Meeting	Freehouse	London	
2020	Barely Furtive Pleasures	Nir Altman	Munich	
2020	Sets & Scenarios	Nottingham Contemporary	Nottingham	
2021	Corps	Mamoth	London	
2022	Sex	Moarain House	London	
2022	Not before it has forgotten you	Nicoletti Contemporary	London	
2022	Not before it has forgotten you	The Pole Gallery	Paris	
2023	Ideal Shapes of Disappearing	Silke Lindner	New York	
2023	Stilled Images	Tube Gallery	Mallorca	
2023	The Living House	Van Gogh House	London	
2024	Channel	Centre d'Art Contemporain de Nîmes	Nîmes	
2024	SL X RE	Silke Lindner	New York	
2024	Air de Repos	CAPC musée d'art contemporain de Bordeaux	Bordeaux	
2025	Steadystate	Galleria Zero	Milan	
