= Sam Orlando Miller =

British artist

- Born: London, England
- Known for: Sculpture

Sam Orlando Miller (born 1966) is a British artist specialising in sculptural artworks made of mirror.

== Early life ==
Miller was born in London and grew up there, spending time in the workshop of his family's silversmithing business. There he learnt to work with the reflective surface of silver and how it interacts with the space around it.

Miller graduated (1986) in Fine Art from Falmouth School of Art. His graduation theses subject was the work of American artist Barbara Kruger.

== Work ==
In 1994, after time spent living and working in Italy and Scotland, Miller returned to London. There he established a studio for projects for commercial and residential interiors. The studio made high specification sculptural objects, interiors and fittings.

In 2002 he relocated to a remote part of Marche, central Italy. He continued to make functional sculptural objects and interior fittings and furniture. Alongside this work he created drawings, paintings and steel sculptures, some of which would later form the Nostalgia Futuro series, completed in 2016.

In 2005, to coincide with an exhibition of his work at Macandi showroom in Mayfair, London, his work was featured in The World of Interiors.

In 2009 Miller made the first Untitled Mirror for his home in Italy, using discarded mirrors he had found and picked up because he was drawn to the flaking silver. He then began working with a palette of handmade glass which he silvered to create mirror, often adding patina by creating marks on the silver itself with painterly lines and numbers. He became interested in creating a complexity of layers for the viewer, drawing attention to the surface of the mirror itself and creating distractions from their own reflection.

Sixteen new works in shaded from inky midnight blue to pale celeste, The Sky Blue Series, were exhibited at Hedge Gallery in September 2012, including the first Untitled Tables I and 2. In this series Miller explored the thought of sky as a metaphor, likening the sky to the mind; dark and light, clear and hazy, intangible and mysterious. In 2012 Miller also exhibited works during Salone del Mobile Milan as guest artist at Gallery Space | Laboratorio Avallone, curated by Malgosia Szemberg.

A large-scale mirror Rete Corallina 6X6/4 was presented at Design Miami/Basel 2015, now in a private collection. An exhibition of eleven new works, Tra L'Occhio e L'Ombra was presented at Gallery FUMI in April 2016, including Sguardo Cubetti series consisting of six functional sculptural objects each using the same form attached into different dimensions, creating tables and cupboards with secret sliding compartments. The exhibition included four works from Miller's very personal Nostalgia Futuro series where the reflection of his studio seen in the mirror panel of the work is painted onto the surrounding surface.

Miller's latest body of work Sentiero dei Viandanti (Path of The Wayfarers) was a creative shift and marked his relocation from Italy to Catalonia, Spain. Pivoting around a large free-standing sculptural mirror work, Rifugio dei Viandanti (Sanctuary of The Wayfarers), the installation was designed to present the back of the work, where Miller's making and structuring was clearly visible like the clues on the back of a painting for the visitor to discover as they move around the gallery.

== Personal ==
Sam Orlando Miller is married to photographer and filmmaker Helen Underwood Miller.

== Selected exhibitions ==
2004

- Exhibition of objects and furniture, Macandi Showrooms, London, UK

2005

- Made in Italy, Macandi Showrooms, London, UK

2006

- Before the Thought of God, curated by Andrew Hewish, Centre for Recent Drawing, London, UK
- Group Exhibition, Pinacoteca Santa Vittoria in Matenano, Italy

2012

- Guest artist at Gallery Space | Studio Avallone, curated by Malgosia Szemberg, Salone del Mobile, Milan, Italy
- Flection, Hedge Gallery, San Francisco, USA
- They Sky Blue Series, Hedge Gallery, San Francisco, USA

2014

- Wallpaper Handmade, Salone del Mobile, Milan, Italy
- Modern Makers, curated by Sara Griffiths, Sotheby's, Chatsworth House, UK

2015

- Design Days Dubai, Dubai, UAE
- Design Miami/Basel 2015, Basel, Switzerland

2016

- Sam Orlando Miller | Tra L'Occhio e L'Ombra, Gallery FUMI, London, UK

2017

- Salon Art + Design, New York City, USA

2018

- Reflections, ammann//gallery, Cologne, Germany
- Re-considering Canon, Design Museum, London, UK
- Now and Then | 10 years of Collectable Creativity, curated by Libby Sellers, Gallery FUMI, London, UK

2019

- Sam Orlando Miller | Sentiero dei Viandanti, Path of The Wayfarers. Gallery FUMI, London, UK

2020

- 2020: It’s Good to be Home, Gallery FUMI, London, UK
- ‘Kleureyck, Van Eyck’s Colours in Design’, Design Museum Gent, Gent, Belgium
