= Ginny on Frederick =

Art gallery in London, UK (2020)

Coordinates: 51.520222°N 0.101011°W

- Former name: Frederick Terrace
- Established: 2020
- Location: London, UK
- Type: Art gallery
- Founder: Freddie Powell
- Curator: Freddie Powell
- Website: ginnyonfrederick.com

Ginny on Frederick is an art gallery in London. It was founded by Freddie Powell in 2020.

== About ==
The gallery's name refers both to founder Freddie Powell and his mother, Ginny.

== Background ==
The gallery was founded in 2021 (previously Frederick Terrace (2020)) by Freddie Powell.

Powell grew up in Hertfordshire. He studied Printmaking at Rhode Island School of Design (RISD), where he realised he was not an artist, but loved being around other artists so "having a gallery is the next best thing". Powell curated his first show in a motel with Alexandra Metcalf (who he studies at RISD with). He previously worked with White Cube.

Prior to Ginny on Frederick, Powell ran Frederick Terrace, in Hackney. After signing the lease, he did one group show in the location before it was forced to close due to the covid lockdowns.

In 2021, Powell secured the Clerkenwell space. The first show was of artist Jack O'Brien in September 2021.

As of 2023, the exhibitions in the gallery had been "almost exclusively with friends, or friends of friends", including Powell's partner Lewis Teague Wright (who set up Lock Up International). In 2023, Powell was also considering moving to another space.

== Location ==
Ginny on Frederick is located in London's Smithfield Market in Clerkenwell, London.

== Exhibitions ==
=== Gallery exhibitions ===
Year	Artist	Title	Ref
	Alexandra Metcalf		
	Tommy Xie		
	Tom Worsfold		
	Lewis Teague Wright		
	Bruno Zhu		
		Civil Twilight	
2021	Jack O’Brien	Waiting for the Sun to Kill Me	
2022	Eva Gold	The Last Cowboys	
2022	Alex Margo Arden	All Clear	

=== Off-site exhibitions ===
Year	Title	Venue	Location	Notes	Ref
2022	To More Time	Lock Up International		Group exhibition: Jack O’Brien, Hunter Foster and Takuro Tamayama; responding to Felix Gonzalez-Torres’s Untitled (Perfect Lovers) (1991)	
