= Francisco Sierra =

Francisco Sierra may refer to:

- Francisco Sierra (boxer), Mexican boxer
- Francisco Sierra (artist), contemporary artist
- Francisco Pérez Sierra, Neapolitan painter
