= Andrea Rosen Gallery =

Art gallery in New York City

Coordinates: 40.74909°N 74.00594°W

Andrea Rosen Gallery is an art gallery in New York City, founded by Andrea Rosen in 1990. With two locations in the Chelsea neighborhood of Manhattan, the gallery specializes in contemporary and modern art, representing an international group of established and emerging artists, as well as historical artist estates.

== History and program ==
Andrea Rosen Gallery opened in January 1990 with an inaugural exhibition of paper stack works by Felix Gonzalez-Torres at the gallery's original location at 130 Prince Street in SoHo This exhibition would set the agenda for the gallery's program, conceptually rigorous and advocating an awareness of our responsibility as artists and participants within both the contemporary art world and history.

Since its inception, a key part of the gallery program has been to juxtapose historical material with contemporary work, as well as artists working out of distinct histories. "How do you put works in context with each other in a way that allows you to see more in them?" asks Andrea Rosen, "I'm interested in works that expand our perception of what we might already think."

Andrea Rosen had a role in developing the early careers of such artists as John Currin, Rita Ackermann, John Coplans, Sean Landers, and Wolfgang Tillmans, as well as Andrea Zittel, Ryan Trecartin and Lizzie Fitch, Mika Rottenberg, and David Altmejd whom the gallery continues to represent.

In 1998, the gallery moved to its current primary location at 525 West 24th Street in Chelsea, opening with Andrea Zittel's seminal exhibition Raugh, featuring a series of A-Z Administration living environments.

As a content- and experience-driven and experimental expansion of the primary gallery program, the Andrea Rosen Gallery 2 program was initiated in October 1999. First housed within the main gallery at 525 West 24th Street, Gallery 2 moved to its current location at 544 West 25th Street in 2012. The Gallery 2 program has presented exhibitions concentrating on lesser-known aspects of prominent artists' practices, as well as presenting significant historical exhibitions, first-time one-person shows of emerging artists, experimental projects by gallery artists, and artist-curated shows. The inaugural show, Cellblock II: An Essay in Exhibition Form, was curated by scholar and curator Robert Hobbs and featured works by Vito Acconci, Alice Aycock, Robert Gober, Donald Judd, Robert Morris, Bruce Nauman, Ad Reinhardt, and Sterling Ruby, among others.

In 2015, the Andrea Rosen Gallery celebrated its 25th anniversary. In commemoration, the gallery published a limited edition set of twenty-six books, comprising twenty-five volumes dedicated to notable curated group exhibitions, as well as a complete exhibition chronology.

== Represented artists and estates ==
- David Altmejd
- Carl Andre
- Lynda Benglis
- Aaron Bobrow
- Will Boone
- John Currin
- Hayden Dunham
- Walker Evans
- Lizzie Fitch/Ryan Trecartin
- Llyn Foulkes
- Simon Fujiwara
- Felix Gonzalez-Torres
- Al Hansen
- Elliott Hundley
- Craig Kalpakjian
- Tetsumi Kudo
- Friedrich Kunath
- José Lerma
- Josiah McElheny
- Josephine Meckseper
- László Moholy-Nagy
- Katy Moran
- Robert Motherwell
- Yoko Ono
- Dan Peterman
- Michael Raedecker
- Matthew Ritchie
- Matthew Ronay
- Mika Rottenberg
- Borna Sammak
- Michael St. John
- Alina Szapocznikow
- Wolfgang Tillmans
- Ryan Trecartin
- Richard Tuttle
- Hannah Wilke
- Erik Wysocan
- Andrea Zittel
