= Caroline Achaintre =

German-British artist

- Born: December 1969 (age 56); Toulouse, France
- Education: Kunsthochschule Halle, Chelsea College of Arts, Goldsmiths, University of London
- Website: http://www.carolineachaintre.com

Caroline Achaintre (born December 1969) is a mixed media artist living and working in London. Her work draws heavily on Animism, Expressionism, Theatricality and the Handmade.

== Life and education ==
Born in Toulouse and brought up near Nuremberg, Achaintre trained as a blacksmith, before obtaining a scholarship at the Kunsthochschule Halle. She came to London in 1998 with a DAAD grant to study at the BA programme of Chelsea College of Arts. She later graduated with an MA in Fine Arts from Goldsmiths, University of London before establishing a studio in Homerton, East London.

== Work ==
Much of her earlier work was in textiles, particularly wool, and Primitivist in style, though she has also worked in installation, and also in ink on paper and ceramics. Much of this work draws on traditions of carnival and tribal masks and the potential to both attract and repulse through the materials. She has held a number of residencies and exhibited in a number of locations, including London's Saatchi Gallery, Cell Project Space London, Birmingham's Eastside Projects, and as part of the eighth British Art Show.

As of April 2019, Achaintre is Professor for Painting/Textile Arts at the Burg Giebichenstein University of Art and Design Halle, Germany.

Achaintre is represented by the gallery Von Bartha in Basel. She has held many solo shows in several countries.

== Solo shows ==
- 2025: Gobbler, Art Basel Unlimited, Basel, CH
- 2025: SHAPESHIFTER, Künstlerhaus Marktoberdorf, Marktoberdorf, DE
- 2024: The Seeker, Art: Concept, Paris, F
- 2024: Achaintre Après Achaintre, Secci gallery, Milan, IT
- 2024: The Cast, Duo Show with Raphael Sbrzesny, Haus Coburg, Delmenhorst, DE
- 2023: Her Hare, VISUAL, Carlow, IE
- 2023: Doppelgänger, Museum Lothar Fischer, Neumarkt in der Oberpfalz, DE
- 2023: Roadrunner, Neues Museum, Nuremberg, DE
- 2022: Inhabitants, Encounter, Lisbon, P
- 2022: Shiftings, Pasquart, Biel/Bienne, CH
- 2021: Caroline Achaintre: Shiftings, Kunstmuseum Ravensburg, DE
- 2021: Tête-à-tête, curated by Joël Riff, Art: Concept, Paris, FR
- 2021: Permanente, CAPC, Bordeaux, FR
- 2020: Permanente, Fondazione Giuliani, Rome, IT
- 2020: Vue Liquide, Fondation Thalie, Bruxelles, BE
- 2019: Permanent Wave, Belvedere 21, Vienna, AU
- 2018: Fantômas, De La Warr Pavilion, Bexhill On Sea, GB
- 2018: Duo Infernal, Art: Concept, Paris, FR
- 2018: Caroline Achaintre, BE-PART, Waregem, BE
- 2018: Wimper, Touchstones Rochdale, Rochdale, GB
- 2018: Dissolver, Dortmunder Kunstverein, Dortmund, DE
- 2018: Scanner, Arcade Gallery, London, UK
- 2017: Caroline Achaintre A.D.O., Farbvision, Berlin, DE
- 2017: Caroline Achaintre, FRAC Champagne-Ardenne, Reims, FR
- 2017: Escaner: Caroline Achaintre, Museo de Arte Precolombiano, Quito
- 2016: Limbo, Arcade Gallery, London, GB
- 2016: Boo, c-o-m-p-o-s-i-t-e, Brussels, BE
- 2016: Caroline Achaintre, Baltic Centre for Contemporary Art, Gateshead, GB
- 2015: Caroline Achaintre, Art Now, Tate Britain, London, GB
- 2014: Present/Future, Illy Prize, Castello di Rivoli Museo d’Arte Contemporanea, Turin, IT
- 2014: Caroline Achaintre, Art Now, Tate Britain, London, GB
- 2014: Mooner, Arcade, London, GB
- 2013: Camp Coo, UH Galleries and Smith Row, Hertfordshire and Bury St Edmunds, GB
- 2012: Trip-Dip, Arcade Gallery, London, GB
- 2010: Couleur Locale, Arcade Gallery, London, GB
- 2008: Visor Visitor, Fake Estate, New York, USA
- 2008: Novelty, Galerie Mirko Mayer, Cologne, DE
- 2007: Six Strings, Bloe de la Barra, London, GB
- 2006: Caroline Achaintre, Galerie Mirko Mayer, Cologne, DE
- 2005: DEEDIE, The Showroom, London, GB
- 2004: Quaters, Whitechapel Project Space, London, GB
- 2004: Caroline Achaintre, Galerie Mirko Mayer, Cologne, DE
- 2004: Caroline Achaintre, Lawrence O‘Hana, London, GB
