= Ursula Reuter Christiansen =

German painter and filmmaker

Ursula Reuter Christiansen (born 13 February 1943 in Trier, Germany) creates work, whether it is painting or filmmaking, that showed examples of mythological symbolism.

== Biography ==
Ursula Reuter Christiansen studied literature at the Philipp University in Marburg, Germany. Beginning in 1965, she studied sculpture under Joseph Beuys at the Düsseldorf Academy of Fine Arts.

After moving to Denmark with her husband, Henning Christiansen, in 1969, Reuter Christiansen started to move her focus from sculpture and literature to painting and filmmaking. Her work proved to be influenced by societal pressures she felt as a mother and wife and the feminist art movement activities from about 1970 in Denmark.

Later in 1970, Christiansen released a movie called The Executioner, in which she narrated a story about a woman whose life was changed after giving birth to her husband's child. Although she received a lot of critique for her film by those that viewed it, it was a direct use of Reuter Christiansen’s own experience as a woman, a wife and a mother.

Beginning in 1997, she trained at the Royal Danish Academy of Fine Arts in Copenhagen. She still presently generates various works of art, such as paintings, ceramics and film, which mostly include ideas of marriage and close relationships.

She was awarded an Eckersberg Medal in 2011.

In 2023, the Swiss gallery von Bartha began working with Ursula Reuter Christiansen, presenting her work in Basel and Copenhagen, along with a presentation of her artwork Leporello at Art Basel's Unlimited. In 2024, Ursula Reuter Christiansen's first and largest retrospective exhibition I am Fire and Water was presented at Arken Museum of Modern Art.

== Work ==
Ursula Reuter Christiansen has had many works of art displayed in various museums. Some of her most famous pieces include:

- Marriage (1978)
- A Never Ceasing Voice (1975)
- Money (1975)
- The Woman's ABC (1971)
- Jungle (1968)

== Literature ==
- ARKEN Museum for samtidskunst (red.): I am Fire and Water = Jeg er ild og vand: Ursula Reuter Christiansen. 2024
- Dengsøe, Mai (red.), Poppies mutate into bats. Kbh.: Sabsay, 2021
- Hansen, Frederikke (red.), Sten i floden = Steine im Fluss. Kbh.: Vandkunsten, 2016
