= Stefan von Bartha =

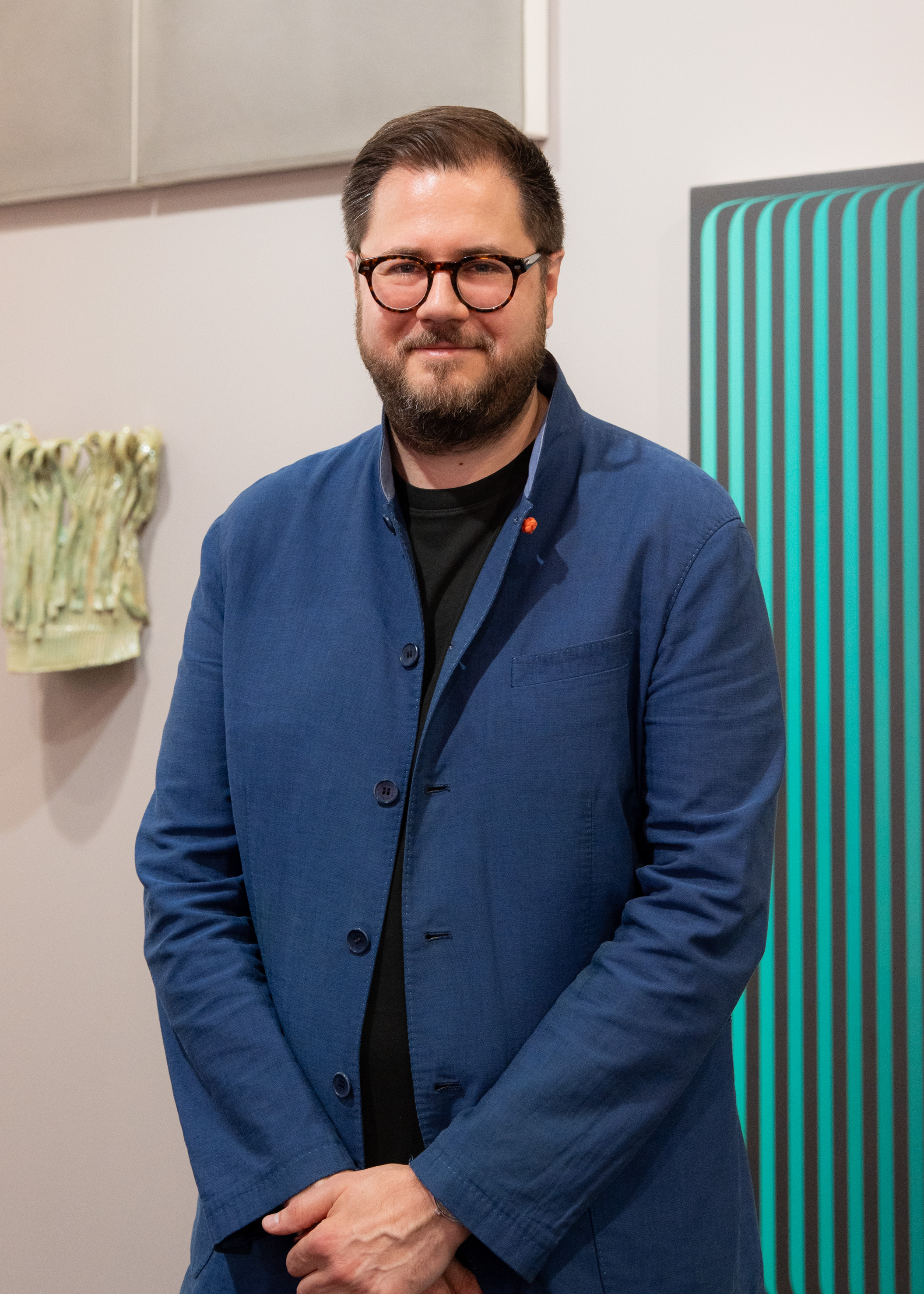
- Born: 1981; Basel, Switzerland
- Occupation: Art dealer
- Known for: Director and owner, von Bartha

Stefan von Bartha (born 1981) is a Swiss art dealer and the director and owner of von Bartha gallery. With locations in Basel and Copenhagen, von Bartha is one of longest-running galleries in the world, and now in its second generation.

== Life and career ==
Stefan von Bartha was born into a family deeply entrenched in the art world, attending his first Art Basel when he was six weeks old. His parents, Margareta and Miklos von Bartha, established the gallery in 1970 which also functioned as their home. Artists and creatives would gather at the gallery and home. At the age of 16. Stefan von Bartha curated his first exhibition of vintage space toys with a loan of 800 Swiss francs from his parents. He sold 419 out of 420 pieces, marking his entry into art and design. After completing his studies in Modern and Contemporary Art at Christie's Education in New York, Stefan von Bartha worked at Sotheby's in Zurich and Galerie Nordenhake in Berlin.

In 2008, Stefan von Bartha became the director of von Bartha gallery. Under his leadership, the gallery has maintained its reputation while also embracing contemporary practices and expanding internationally. von Bartha has continued to focus on a mix of established and emerging artists, presenting a wide range of contemporary art exhibitions and programs.

He serves on the boards of the Friends of Liste Art Fair and Enter Art Fair. He is a patron of Fondation Beyeler, Kunsthalle Basel, Kunstmuseum Basel, Kunsthaus Basel Land and the Swiss Institute of Contemporary Art New York.

Stefan von Bartha is married to Hester Koper who is the co-director of von Bartha. They maintain residences in Basel and Copenhagen.
