= Craig Kalpakjian =

American artist

Craig Kalpakjian (born August 31, 1961) is an American artist working in New York, known for his computer-generated, photo-realistic renderings of anonymous, institutional spaces. He is considered one of the first artists of his generation to make digital images depicting entirely artificial spaces in a fine art context.

== Early life and education ==
Craig Kalpakjian was born in 1961 in Huntington, New York. He received his BA in History of Art from University of Pennsylvania in 1983, where he enrolled to study physics, later shifting his focus to art history, philosophy and literature.

== Art career ==
=== Early work (1989–1995) ===
Kalpakjian emerged onto the New York art scene during the early 1990s as a sculptor and installation artist with work reflecting his interest in technologies of control, containment, and security. This work utilized bulletproof Plexiglas bankteller windows, waiting line stanchions, and security tags—items associated with contemporary paranoia and social control. Though taken out of context these objects still retained a significant aspect of their functionality. Inspired by minimalism and conceptual art, this work was a sort of hybrid between sculpture and installations, employing barriers, waiting lines and other objects that control the way we move through space. These were included in important New York group exhibitions of the '90's, such as those organized by Colin De Land, Kenny Schachter, and Eric Oppenheim, and including other artists emerging at the time such as Andrea Zittel, Rachel Harrison, Rirkrit Tiravanija, Gary Simmons, Jutta Koether, and Ricci Albenda.

=== Image and video work (1995–2007) ===
Using software like AutoCAD and Form-Z, Kalpakjian started making digitally rendered photographic images and video animations of institutional spaces devoid of human occupants, spaces often subjected to the same intensive systems of control and surveillance he explored in his earlier work. These works have been described as hermetic, airless, depicting "a world without depth, in which reality, gradually engulfed by the relentless proliferation of digital information, disappears."

==== Corridor (1995) ====
The video animation Corridor, included in 010101: Art In Technological Times at the San Francisco Museum of Modern Art, consists of a single shot of a curving office corridor that slowly advances. Described as "eerie and vaguely sinister, conjuring a sense of claustrophobia and infinity at the same time... Kalpakjian's deceptively plausible computer-generated animation becomes an apt metaphor for the impersonal spaces of corporate architecture." Since 1999, Corridor has been included in the collections at The Metropolitan Museum of Art.

==== Rendered images ====
The theme of control remained central to Kalpakjian's rendered still images. Depicting darkened, windowless hallways in mute palettes, duct systems embedded within the infrastructure of buildings, at times presented from impossible points of view, many of these works feature the "invisible eyes" and other remote-viewing sensory devices that map actual space with blankets of virtual electronic surveillance. These images have also been said to function by foreclosing all possibility of human entry.

=== Black Box (2002–2013) ===
In 2002 Kalpakjian exhibited the installation Black Box at Andrea Rosen Gallery in New York. This work included a Sony AIBO robot pet dog enclosed in a sealed box reminiscent of an "operant conditioning chamber," or Skinner box, used by researchers to study the behavior of animals in a controlled environment. Each day during the exhibit the dog would take a photograph of the interior of the box. The images were sent wirelessly to a computer and the prints of these photographs were displayed on the gallery wall beside the box. The installation was later included in the 2013 Montreal Photo biennale Le Mois de la Photo à Montreal, titled Drone: The Automated Image, at Vox – Centre de l'image contemporaine, curated by Paul Wombell.

Black Box was the subject of the book Intelligence released by Sternberg Press in 2017.

=== Recent work (2014–present) ===
Michael Ashkin writes that Craig Kalpakjian's "Recent abstract works continue his explorations of spatial visualization. Using non-standard types of perspective, these large-scale inkjet prints present illusions of dimensionality that trouble the distinctions between inside and outside, artifice and reality".

His 2017 exhibit at Kai Matsumiya gallery in New York included a number of large scale prints as well as an installation incorporating a robotic moving head spotlight hanging from an intrusive metal truss.

== Reviews ==
Michael Ashkin wrote that Craig Kalpakjian’s work "sits at the intersection of photography, sculpture, and architecture, and introduces important questions about the larger spatial constructs we inhabit. His work examines the relationship of today's technological apparatus, its political and phenomenological implications, as well as our basic philosophical assumptions underlying western perspectival space."

Craig Kalpakjian’s exhibits have been reviewed in The New York Times, The New Yorker, Frieze and Time Out New York.

His work has been featured in Blind Spot Magazine; Cabinet Magazine; Modern Painters magazine; Visionaire 34 "Paris"; and Visionaire 24 "Light". It has also been included in the books Visions from America: Photography from the Whitney Museum of American Art 1940-2001, New Philosophy for New Media, Subjective Realities: Works from the Refco Collection of Contemporary Photography, Digital Art, The Digital Eye: Photographic Art In The Electronic Age, Photography Reborn: Image Making in the Digital Era; and was used on the cover of the 2001 Picador USA edition of the JG Ballard novel Super-Cannes.

In 2017 Sternberg Press released Craig Kalpakjian - Intelligence, a catalog based on his work Black Box, 2002-2013, including a conversation with Bob Nickas and texts by Paul Wombell and Gilles Deleuze.

== Exhibitions ==
His work has been included in the museum exhibits Reality Check(2008) and After Photoshop: Manipulated Photography in the Digital Age(2012) at the Metropolitan Museum of Art; An Expanded Field of Photography(2015) at the Massachusetts Museum of Contemporary Art The Sun Placed in The Abyss (2016) at The Columbus Museum of Art, Columbus, Ohio Visions from America: Photographs from the Whitney Museum of American Art, 1940-2001; and Bitstreams at the Whitney Museum of American Art; and 010101: Art In Technological Times (2001), at the San Francisco Museum of Modern Art.

He has had one person gallery exhibitions in New York at Kai Matsumiya gallery, Andrea Rosen Gallery, and Robert Miller gallery, in Paris at Galerie Nelson, and in Geneva at Galerie Analix.

== Teaching ==
From 2005 through 2015 he was an adjunct professor and Artist in Residence at Maryland Institute College of Art in Baltimore, and from 2007 has been a Studio Instructor in the MFA program at Parsons School of Design in New York. He was chosen as the Teiger Mentor in the Arts at Cornell University for the fall 2016 semester.

== Collections ==
Kalpakjian’s works are in the collections of the Museum of Modern Art; the Whitney Museum of American Art; and the Metropolitan Museum of Art in New York; the San Francisco Museum of Modern Art, the Art Institute of Chicago and the Centre Pompidou, Paris.
