= Laura Buckley =

Irish video and installation artist (1977–2022)

- Born: 1977; Galway
- Died: 2022 (aged 44–45)
- Education: NCAD; Chelsea College of Art and Design
- Known for: Fata Morgana

Laura Buckley (1977–2022) was an Irish video and installation artist, and sculptor. Born in Galway, Ireland, she lived and worked in London. She exhibited throughout the UK and internationally.

== Early life and education ==
Buckley was born in County Galway, Ireland and lived in a small town. After graduating from NCAD in Dublin in 2000, she received her MA from Chelsea College of Art and Design in London in 2007.

== Work ==
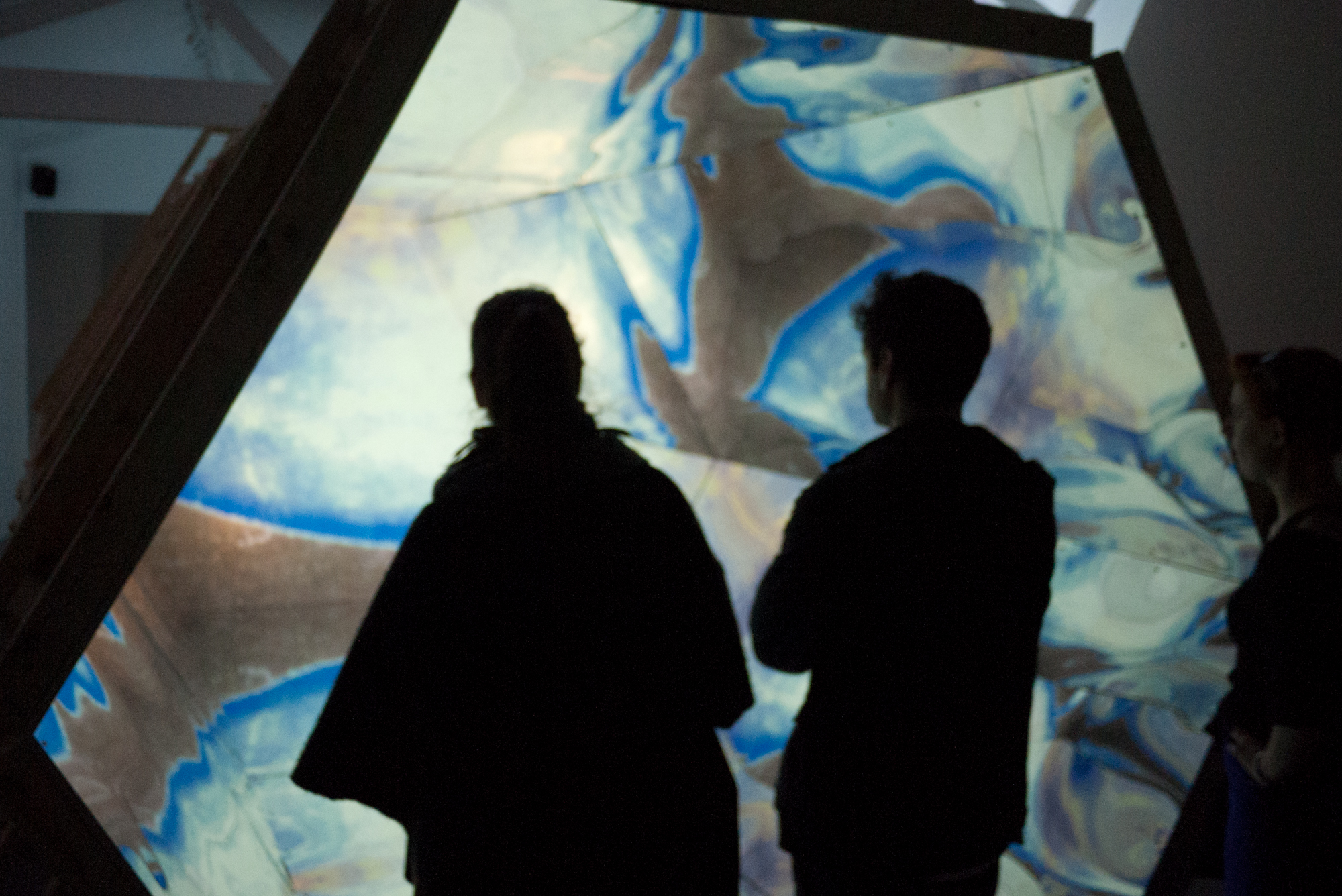
Fata Morgana, a giant kaleidoscope art installation. 2012.

Buckley worked in various digital and video medias including "moving image, kinetics, sound, light, sculpture and digital print". She described to Bomb magazine in 2014 that she had stopped painting and started "painting with light". She hoped her work made people feel: "A connection. Less alone." A Frieze review described her installations as containing eclectic sources "that provided the intricate layers for Buckley’s sound, video and sculptural installations."

== Career ==
Fata Morgana was a "dazzling and disorientating large-scale", walk-in, kaleidoscope installation Buckley made for Cell Project Space in 2012. It was shown again in 2019 for a group exhibition titled Kaleidoscope at Saatchi Gallery.

Buckley exhibited at Mother's Tankstation in Dublin in 2010, and was part of Into Boundless Space I Leap, an exhibition based on the work of Scottish scientist James Clerk Maxwell at the University of Cambridge in 2016. She also exhibited at Art House – an illegally constructed 'beach house' on a roof in Hackney – in 2016. She collaborated with many artists in exhibitions and performances including Kim Coleman at Block 336 (2016), Paul Purgas at the Whitechapel Gallery (2015), Dan Coopey at Turner Contemporary (2013), and with Dave MacLean and Haroon Mirza at Rokeby (2009).

Her work is in the Zabludowicz Collection.
