= Mika Rottenberg =

Argentine artist (born 1976)

Mika Rottenberg (Hebrew: מיקה רוטנברג; born 1976) is a contemporary Argentine born U.S. based video artist who lives and works in New York. Rottenberg is best known for her video and installation work that often "investigates the link between the female body and production mechanisms". Her work has been exhibited both nationally and internationally.

== Early life ==
Mika Rottenberg was born in Buenos Aires, Argentina in 1976. Rottenberg's family relocated to Israel in 1977. In 1998, she attended HaMidrasha School of Art, Beit Berl College in Israel. In 2000, Rottenberg moved to New York to complete her education, receiving a Bachelor of Fine Arts from the School of Visual Arts in 2000 and a Master of Fine Arts from Columbia University in 2004. She was represented by Andrea Rosen Gallery in New York City until the gallery closed its doors in 2017. She was also represented by Galerie Laurent Godin in Paris. As of 2019, she is represented by Hauser & Wirth.

== Work ==
Rottenberg's video works feature women with various physical eccentricities, such as being very tall, large-bodied, or muscular. In the videos, these women perform physical acts that serve as an allegory for the human condition in post-modern times. Her videos are inspired by women who advertise their unusual characteristic online to be utilized for hire. "She hires women who in some form or another, use their body to profit in some way, and she is interested in how these bodies are marginalized and how "women's labor has been marginalized and almost invisible throughout history." "Her work explicitly concerns interactions between bodies and machines and 'the idea of ownership generally'." "Her works allegorize the increasing capitalization of biological life itself: not what labors produce but what bodies consist of, grow, secrete, and reproduce….by exploring relations between immaterial goods, bodily by-products, and manufactured products, Rottenberg exposes and playfully transgresses the divisions of race, gender, and geography that underlie the post-Fordist world system". She describes her work as "social Surrealism" and "a spiritual kind of Marxism." She strives to "... give space and a stage to women who don't always obey gender and conventional beauty expectations."

== Significant works ==
Mary's Cherries (2004), which shows a woman's red fingernails being grown, clipped, and transformed into maraschino cherries, was influenced by a story about a woman with a rare blood type who quit her job to sell her blood. The women featured in Mary's Cherries are all wrestlers for hire.

In Tropical Breeze (2004), champion bodybuilder Heather Foster drives a converted truck that functions as a shop, packaging her sweat. In the back of the truck, dancer Felicia Ballos pedals a makeshift device, picking up tissues and using gum to stick them to a clothesline, transferring them to Heather, who uses them to collect her sweat for packaging and later for sale.

Dough (2005-2006) watches Raqui, a size-acceptance activist and frequent collaborator of Rottenberg's as she cries tears that evaporate into steam, causing dough to rise. The dough is then pulled and pushed through holes into multiple rooms by Tall Kat, a skinny, 6'9" woman who can reach from room to room. Through their actions, a unit that measures labor is created.

Cheese (2007) is a multi-channel video installation that depicts women with very long hair milking cows and making cheese using a machine powered by the movement of the women's hair. Rottenberg's work was showcased at the Whitney Biennial 2008.

Squeeze (2010) is a video shot on location at a lettuce farm in Arizona and a rubber plant farm in Kirala, India. Actors engage in a variety of gestures including thrusting a tongue through a stucco wall, a line of women massaging hands that protrude through a wall, and Bunny Glamazon being smashed between two mattresses.

In 2011, Rottenberg collaborated with artist Jon Kessler on SEVEN, a performance and installation created for Performa 11 in New York City, performed at Nicole Klagsbrun Gallery. According to the Performa website, SEVEN "collapse[d] film time and real time to create an intricate laboratory that channels body fluids and colors into a spectacle on the African savannah. In New York, a "Chakra Juicer" will capture sweat from seven performers engaging in ritualistic athletic activity."

In Ponytails (2014), a pair of kinetic sculptures, one blonde and one dark-haired, extend and flip frantically through two glory-hole-like openings in separate gallery walls.

Bowls, Balls, Souls, Holes (2014) is a video where bingo, stretching skin, clothespins, a dripping air conditioner, and melting polar ice caps collide in time and space. "You feel that you're on the verge of comprehending a cosmic mystery."

In 2015, her work NoNoseKnows was featured in the Venice Biennale as part of an exhibition curated by Okwui Enwezor: "All the World's Futures."

Ceiling Fan #4 (2016) is viewed through narrow, horizontal openings in a gallery wall. Inside, ceiling fans turn, illuminated by pastel light.

Cosmic Generator (2017), is a video installation shot partly in Mexicali, along the U.S. Mexico border. It follows workers in cramped spaces performing absurd tasks such as crushing lightbulbs, accompanied by a soundtrack of electronic buzzes and blips. The viewer is shown a series of tunnels, ostensibly linking a variety of workshops and restaurants shown later in the twenty-six-minute piece.

Spaghetti Blockchain (2019) was premiered at the New Museum in New York, in a show called Mika Rottenberg: Easypieces. This piece "explores ancient and new ideas about materialism and considers how humans both comprise and manipulate matter." The video consists of female throat singers from Tuva, Tyva Kyzy, ASMR-esque videos of colors and sizzling goo, a potato-farm, and interior shots of a Genevan Hall. Rottenberg places these scenes in "a kind of superfluous factory of her devising, whose primary product seems to be imagery that's simultaneously pleasurable and queasily troubling."

== Infinite Earth Foundation ==
Infinite Earth Foundation is a philanthropic non-profit foundation founded in 2008 by Mika Rottenberg and artist Alona Harpaz. Their goal is to produce photographic prints to sell "at a cheaper price to people who are not necessarily art collectors". For their first project, they helped raise money to improve the working conditions at a hand-looming center in Chamba, a north Indian village.

== Awards ==
In 2019, Rottenberg won the Kurt Schwitters Prize. Kurt Schwitters was a German painter who died in 1948. The prize was founded in 1982 by the Niedersachsische Sparkassenstiftung, a musical club in Hanover, Germany. Past Kurt Schwitters Prize winners include Theaster Gates (2017) and Pierre Huyghe (2015). "In a joint statement, the jury members said: "The imaginative video works and installations by Mika Rottenberg intertwine documentary with fiction in surreal allegories of today's life. Their ingenious visual narratives illuminate the interconnected relationships between economies, geographic areas, forms of work, and added value. . . . In her interdisciplinary-experimental artistic approach and in the exploration of the interweaving of the machine and the body, the sensitivity of groundbreaking artist Kurt Schwitters resounds. This makes her the ideal candidate for the Kurt Schwitters Prize."

In 2018, Rottenberg was invited as guest artist to the physics laboratory CERN.

In 2018, Rottenberg received the James Dicke Contemporary Artist Prize from the Smithsonian American Art Museum (SAAM).

In 2014, Rottenberg received the Ruth Ann and Nathan Perlmutter Artist-in-Residence Award at The Rose Art Museum at Brandeis University.

In 2011, Rottenberg took part in Sommerakademie im Zentrum Paul Klee, Bern, curated by Pipilotti Rist at the Planete Doc Film Festival Selection in Warsaw.

in 2010, Rottenberg received The Flaherty International Film Seminar Fellowship.

In 2010, Rottenberg was part of the New Vision Programme Selection at CPH: DOX Film Festiva in Copenhagen.

In 2009, Rottenberg was a 5x5 Castello 09 Prize Finalist at Espai D'art Contemporani de Castello in Spain.

In 2006, Rottenberg received the Cartier Award, in conjunction with Frieze Art Fair in New York, NY.

== Selected solo exhibitions ==
- Museum Tinguely, Mika Rottenberg: Antimatter Factory, Basel, Switzerland (2024)
- Hauser & Wirth, Mika Rottenberg:‘Mika Rottenberg’, LA, California (2022)
- Musée d'art contemporain de Montréal, Mika Rottenberg:‘Mika Rottenberg’, Montreal, Canada (2022)
- Louisiana Museum of Modern Art, Mika Rottenberg: Bowls Balls Souls Holes, Humlebæk, Denmark, (2021)
- New Museum, Mika Rottenberg: Easypieces, NY, New York (traveled to Museum of Contemporary Art, Chicago) (2019)
- Museum d'Arte Moderni di Bologna, 'Mika Rottenberg', Bologna, Italy (2019)
- Goldsmiths Centre for Contemporary Art, 'Mika Rottenberg', London, United Kingdom (2018)
- Spruth Magers, 'Bowls, Balls, Souls, Holes', Berlin Germany (2018)
- Bass Museum of Art, Mika Rottenberg, Miami FL (2017)
- Palais de Tokyo, 'Mika Rottenberg', Paris, France (2016)
- Sishang Art Museum, 'NoNoseKnows', Beijing, China (2015)
- Andrea Rosen Gallery, "Bowls, Balls, Souls, Holes," NYC, NY (2014)
- The Rose Art Museum, 'Mika Rottenberg: Bowls, Balls, Souls, Holes,' Waltham, MA (2014)
- The Israel Museum, 'Squeeze: Video Works by Mika Rottenberg,' Jerusalem, Israel (2013)
- Performa 11 Commission at Nicole Klagsbrun Gallery, SEVEN (in collaboration with Jon Kessler), New York, NY (2011)
- De Appel arts centre, 'Mika Rottenberg: Dough Cheese Squeeze and Tropical Breeze: Video Works 2003–2010,' Amsterdam, Netherlands (2011)
- San Francisco Museum of Modern Art, 'New Work: Mika Rottenberg', San Francisco CA (2010)
- KW Institute for Contemporary Art, 'Dough', Berlin Germany (2006)
- Nicole Klagsbrun Gallery, 'Dough', New York, New York (2006)
- Le Case D'Arte, 'Tropical Breeze', Milan, Italy (2005)
- P.S.1 Contemporary Art Center, 'Mary's Cherries,' Queens, NY (2004)

== Selected group exhibitions ==
- Galleri Bo Bjerggaard, 'Contemporary Obsessions', Copenhagen, Denmark (2019)
- Contemporary Art Center, 'Resilient Future', Thessaloniki, Greece (2018)
- Art Basel Cities, 'Hopscotch', Buenos Aires, Argentina (2018)
- US Pavilion, 'Venice Architecture Biennale', Venice, Italy (2018)
- The Met Breuer, 'The Body Politic', New York NY (2017)
- 2015 Venice Biennale, 'All the World's Futures' (cur. Okwui Enwezor), Venice, Italy (2015)
- The Jewish Museum, 'Sights and Sounds. Global Film and Video', New York NY (2014)
- Taipei Biennial 2014 (cur. Nicolas Bourriaud), Taipei, Taiwan (2014)
- 13th Istanbul Biennial (cur. Fulya Erdemci), Istanbul, Turkey (2013)
- Garage Projects at the 54th Venice Biennale, 'Commercial Break' (cur. Neville Wakefield), Venice, Italy (2011)
- Guggenheim Museum, curated by Nancy Spector and David Van Der Leer, New York NY (2010)
- 2nd Bienal del Fin del Mundo, 'Intemperie' (cur. Alfons Hug), Ushuaia, Argentina (2009)
- Whitney Museum of American Art, 'Whitney Biennial 2008', New York NY (2008)
- Tate Modern, 'The Irresistible Force' (cur. Ben Borthwick and Kerryn Greenberg), London, United Kingdom (2007)
- 2nd Moscow Biennale (cur, Nicholas Bourriaud), Moscow, Russia (2007)

== Collections ==
Rottenberg's work is represented in numerous major museum and public collections including the Solomon R. Guggenheim Museum, Brooklyn Museum, National Gallery of Canada, The Metropolitan Museum of Art, The Museum of Modern Art, San Francisco Museum of Modern Art, Institute of Contemporary Art, Boston and Tel Aviv Museum of Art and Rose Art Museum.
