= Sean Landers =

American artist

Sean Landers (born 1962) is an American contemporary artist known for an interdisciplinary practice that spans painting, drawing, sculpture, video, and writing. Emerging in the early 1990s, Landers became associated with a generation of artists who foregrounded autobiography, self-analysis, and the confessional voice as both subject and strategy. His work frequently incorporates handwritten text—ranging from diaristic reflection to philosophical inquiry—alongside recurring characters, animals, and symbolic motifs, creating a body of work that examines identity, ambition, doubt, masculinity, and the role of the artist.

Landers’ practice moves fluidly between humor and vulnerability, sincerity and irony, while maintaining a sustained investigation into the construction of the self through language and image. Landers came to prominence in the early 1990s amid the New York art scene, at a moment when artists were increasingly challenging traditional distinctions between sincerity and irony, personal narrative and conceptual rigor. His work was often discussed in relation to a broader turn toward language, self-exposure, and performative identity in post-Conceptual art, as well as alongside peers associated with the so-called “confessional” or diaristic mode. While engaging strategies linked to Conceptualism, Pop, and institutional critique, Landers distinguished himself through a sustained, long-term use of autobiography as material, treating the artist’s inner life as both content and formal structure within painting and sculpture.

== Early life ==
Sean Landers was born in Springfield, Massachusetts in 1962 and raised in Palmer, Massachusetts. He was introduced to painting at an early age through his family, learning to paint from his mother, Diana Landers, and his maternal grandmother, Muriel Brown George, who was a painter and a student of J. J. LaValley, a Springfield-based artist and educator. This early familial training preceded and informed Landers’ later formal education in art.

Landers received a Bachelor of Fine Arts in 1984 from the Philadelphia College of Art (now the University of the Arts) and earned a Master of Fine Arts in 1986 from the Yale School of Art. At Yale, he was part of a cohort that included artists such as John Currin, Lisa Yuskavage, and Richard Phillips, all of whom would become influential figures in contemporary American painting.

== Work ==
=== Work and Themes ===
Landers is best known for his use of handwritten text as a central visual and conceptual element. His paintings frequently feature first-person statements resembling diary entries or confessional writing, addressing themes such as existential doubt, artistic ambition, legacy, masculinity, and self-critique. These texts often shift in tone between sincerity and irony, exaggeration and self-questioning, emphasizing the instability of the speaking voice.

A defining aspect of Landers’ practice is the tension between sincerity and performance. While the language suggests emotional transparency, critics have noted that the sustained repetition and theatricality of confession reveal the “I” in his work as a constructed persona rather than a stable autobiographical subject. In this way, his work engages with postmodern critiques of authorship, authenticity, and selfhood. Landers has described his practice as operating between confession and fiction, constructing what he has called an illusion of psychological transparency. Critics have observed that his handwritten texts—often anxious, repetitive, and self-doubting—encourage autobiographical readings, while the recurring animal imagery complicates this interpretation. Animals such as rabbits, deer, bears, owls, and dogs have been interpreted as symbolic extensions of the artist’s persona, externalizing emotional states including fear, vulnerability, aggression, and desire. Rather than illustrating the text, these figures introduce a tension between image and language that underscores the performative and constructed nature of confession in his work.

Animal Imagery

Landers frequently incorporates animals, particularly rabbits, deer, owls, bears, and dogs, into his paintings and drawings. These figures often appear alone or in confrontational or contemplative poses and are commonly interpreted as symbolic or allegorical representations of psychological states such as vulnerability, longing, fear, and isolation.

Rather than functioning as narrative illustrations, the animals operate as visual counterparts to the confessional texts, externalizing internal emotion and reinforcing the fractured nature of the self presented in the work.

Surrealism and Free Association

Landers’ practice has also been discussed in relation to contemporary surrealism, particularly through his embrace of free association, irrational juxtaposition, and stream-of-consciousness writing. Landers employs strategies associated with automatism and non-linear thought as methods for destabilizing meaning and authorship. His handwritten texts often unfold as extended chains of doubt, desire, contradiction, and self-interrogation, recalling the logic of automatic writing. Alongside animal imagery, Landers repeatedly depicts surreal, human-like figures, including a wooden boy, a forlorn robot, a woebegone clown, and a sad snowman, among many others. These characters, like the animals that populate his paintings, function as symbolic stand-ins for internal states rather than narrative protagonists.

Their artificial, fragile, or emotionally exposed qualities mirror the confessional voice of the text, reinforcing the illusion of psychological transparency while simultaneously signaling its constructed nature. In this way, image and language operate together to sustain and subtly undermine the viewer’s belief in the sincerity of the speaking subject. Landers has expressed admiration for René Magritte’s La Periode Vache, a deliberately crude and anti-aesthetic body of work produced in the late 1940s that rejected painterly refinement and conventional symbolism.

This influence is reflected in Landers's embrace of awkwardness, exaggeration, humor, and visual dissonance, as well as his resistance to polished finish or fixed meaning. As with Magritte’s Vache paintings, stylistic disruption in Landers’ work functions as a means of undermining artistic authority and interpretive certainty.

Text in Painting

Landers employs a variety of formal strategies to incorporate text into his paintings. In some works, language appears embedded within natural forms, such as arborglyphs carved into Aspen trees, or signposts, while in others the text is imprinted onto spines of library books. In others text floats independently across the painted surface. At times, writing occupies the background as a secondary visual field, while in other instances it becomes the sole imagery, filling the canvas. Landers has also produced works in which text accumulates in dense, layered configurations resembling word clouds, emphasizing internal thought, repetition, excess, and instability of meaning. These shifting modes of presentation underscore the fluctuating relationship between image and language in his practice and reinforce the constructed, performative nature of the confessional voice.

Writing, Drawing and Video

Alongside painting, Landers has maintained an extensive drawing and writing practice, including notebooks, journals, and works on paper. These works frequently combine text, figures, and cartoons, further blurring distinctions between visual art and literary expression. His integration of writing and image situates his work in dialogue with both conceptual art and confessional literary traditions. In addition to painting and drawing, Landers has produced video works that extend his interest in free association, absurdity, and performative selfhood. These videos often feature improvised monologues, repetition, and non-sequitur actions, emphasizing process and immediacy over narrative coherence.

Sculpture

In addition to painting, drawing, and video, Landers has consistently maintained a sculpture practice. Working in three dimensions, often in bronze or ceramic, he renders many of the same figures that appear in his paintings and drawings. These sculptural works translate his recurring characters—both animals and surreal, human-like forms—into physical space, extending the psychological and symbolic concerns of his two-dimensional work. By repeating these figures across media, Landers emphasizes continuity between image, object, and narrative while underscoring the constructed nature of his visual vocabulary.

== Exhibitions ==
Landers has exhibited widely in the United States and internationally. His work has been presented in solo and group exhibitions at institutions and galleries, including:

- Musée de la Chasse et de la Nature, Paris
- Consortium Museum, Dijon
- New Museum, New York
- Contemporary Art Museum St. Louis
- Kunsthalle Zürich
- The Museum of Contemporary Art, Los Angeles
- The Whitney Museum of American Art, New York
- PS1 Contemporary Art Center, New York
- Massachusetts Museum of Contemporary Art, North Adams
- Deichtorhallen Hamburg

Collections

Landers’ work is held in numerous public and private collections, including:

- Brooklyn Museum of Art, NY
- Dallas Museum of Art, TX
- Denver Art Museum, CO
- Fundación/Colección Jumex, Mexico City, Mexico
- Hammer Museum, Los Angeles, CA
- Los Angeles County Museum of Art, CA
- Musée de la Chasse et de la Nature, Paris, France
- The Museum of Modern Art (MoMA), NY
- Tate Modern, London, Great Britain
- The Whitney Museum of American Art, NY

=== Around the World Alone ===
For his exhibition Around the World Alone at Friedrich Petzel Gallery in 2011, Landers once again returned to the lonely clown in the boat from his 1996 painting, Alone. He used his long-term fascination with the Golden Globe race of 1968 as a point of departure. This race was the first solo round-the-world yacht race, in which nine men embarked from England; the frontrunner decided the race was irrelevant and turned around at the last moment to continue around the world a second time (Bernard Moitessier), one contestant threw himself into the ocean (Donald Crowhurst), and only one man completed the race (Robin Knox-Johnston). It is hard not to realize that Landers at any one time could be any of these contestants. The paintings included in Around the World Alone depict the solo-circumnavigating sailor-clown ranging in age from a young boy to an old man. Punctuated by contemplative scenes, the hero can be seen progressing in age as he battles the ferocious seas and storms in his seaworthy boat S.V. Monos.

=== Sean Landers ===
Sean Landers' exhibition at Le Consortium - his first in France in over 20 years - offers a retrospective outlook on his pictorial work: about forty paintings created between 1993 and today, mostly from private collections, revisit the various series punctuating his artistic path.

== Collections ==
Landers's work is in the permanent collections of the Whitney Museum of American Art, Tate Modern, Dallas Art Museum, DESTE Foundation for Contemporary Art in Athens, Greece, Los Angeles County Museum of Art, Fundación/Colección Jumex in Mexico City, Kistefos Museum in Jevnaker, Norway, the Brooklyn Museum, and the Walker Art Center, among others.

== Personal life ==
Sean Landers currently lives and works in New York. He is married to Michelle Reyes Landers, previously director at Andrea Rosen Gallery and The Felix Gonzalez-Torres Foundation.
