= Anton Prinner =

Hungarian–French artist and author (1902–1983)

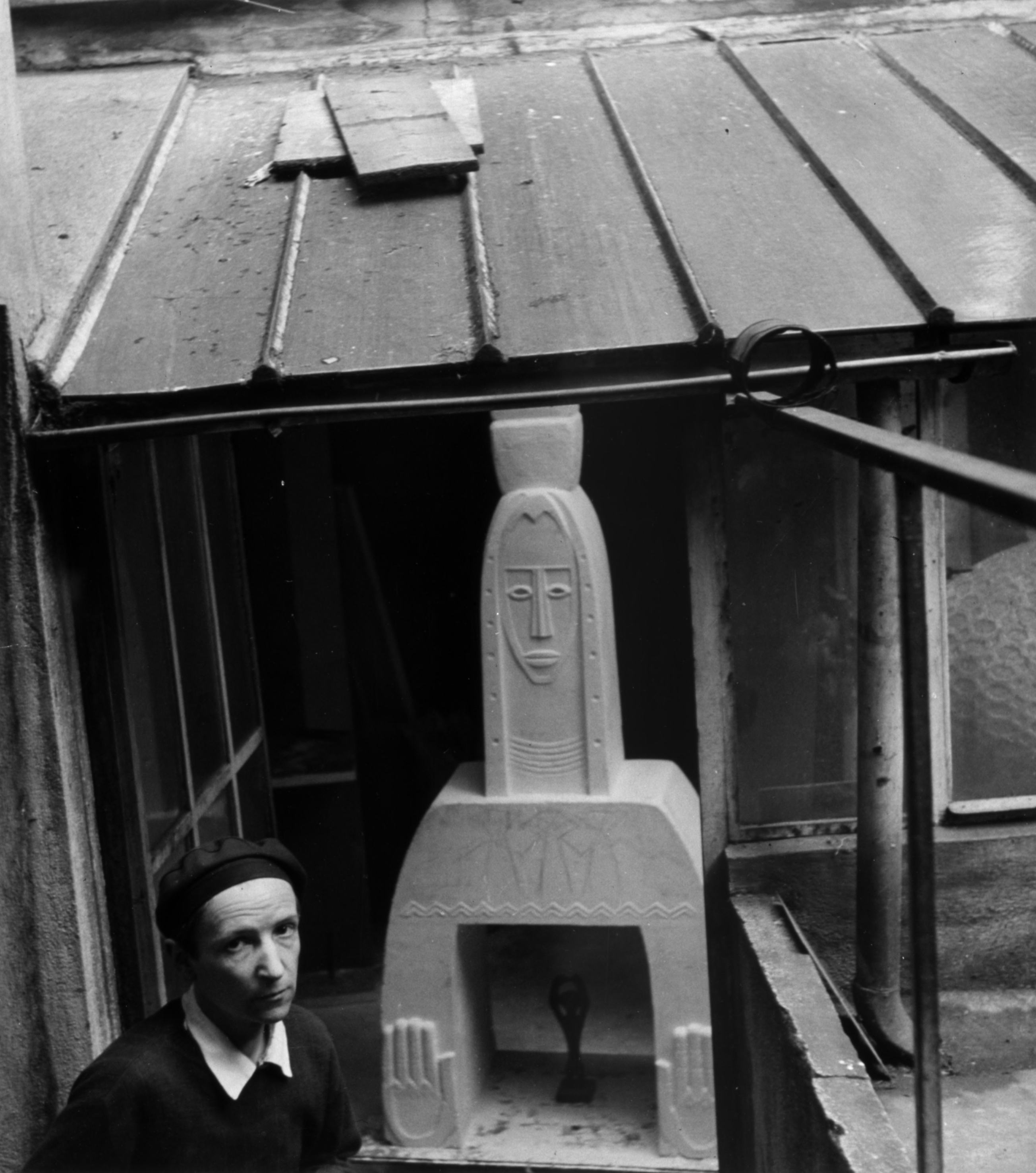
Prinner, outside his studio

Anton Prinner (1902 – 1983) was a Hungarian, naturalized French painter, engraver and sculptor. Born Anna Prinner in Budapest, Prinner began using the first name Anton when he moved to France in 1928.

== Biography ==
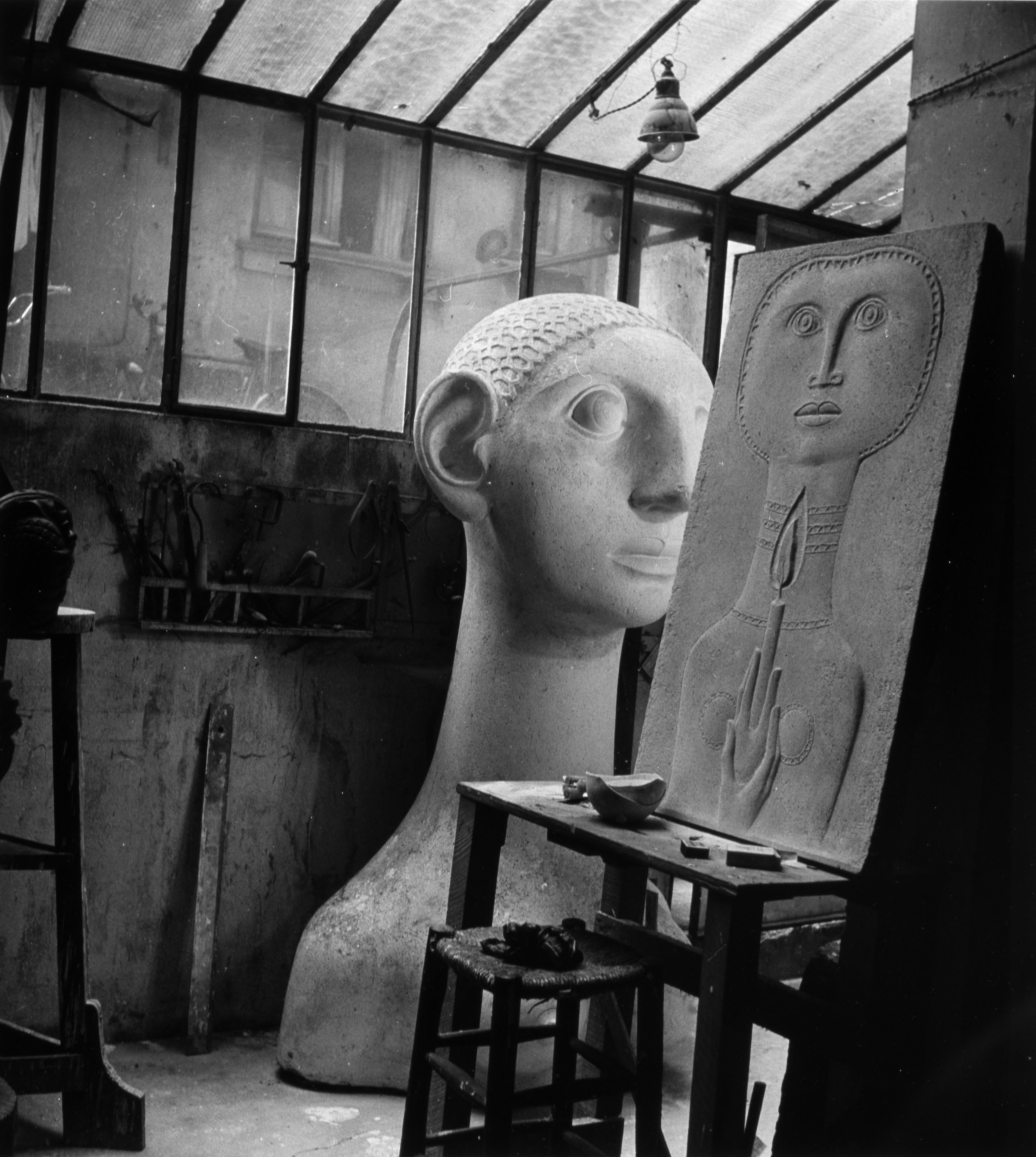
Prinner's studio, photographed by Emmy Andriesse

From 1920 to 1924, Prinner studied painting at the Academy of Fine Arts under Gyula Rudnay and János Vaszary. He began his constructivism period in 1932 and entered Stanley William Hayter's studio to study engraving. In 1937, he entered his figurative period with the work La Femme taureauen in granite. He created his first wood sculpture, La Femme à la natte, in 1940.

His interest in Egypt inspired him to invent papyrogravure, a technique for printmaking using cardboard instead of the unwieldy copper plates that were prevalent at the time. Using this method, he made his own prints for his work Gravures de l'Apocalypse.

During World War II, the artist Alexandre Heimovits took refuge during a time at Prinner's studio.

== Bibliography ==
- Fabrice Flahutez, Emmanuel Pernoud, Benoit Decron, Anton Prinner : exposition présentée au Musée de l'abbaye Sainte-Croix des Sables d'Olonne du 1er juillet au 1er octobre 2006 et à l'Institut hongrois de Paris en 2007, Paris Les Sables d'Olonne, Panama Musée de l'abbaye Sainte-Croix, 2006, 160 p. (ISBN 978-2-7557-0190-6, BNF 40245913).
