= Cell Project Space =

Art gallery in London

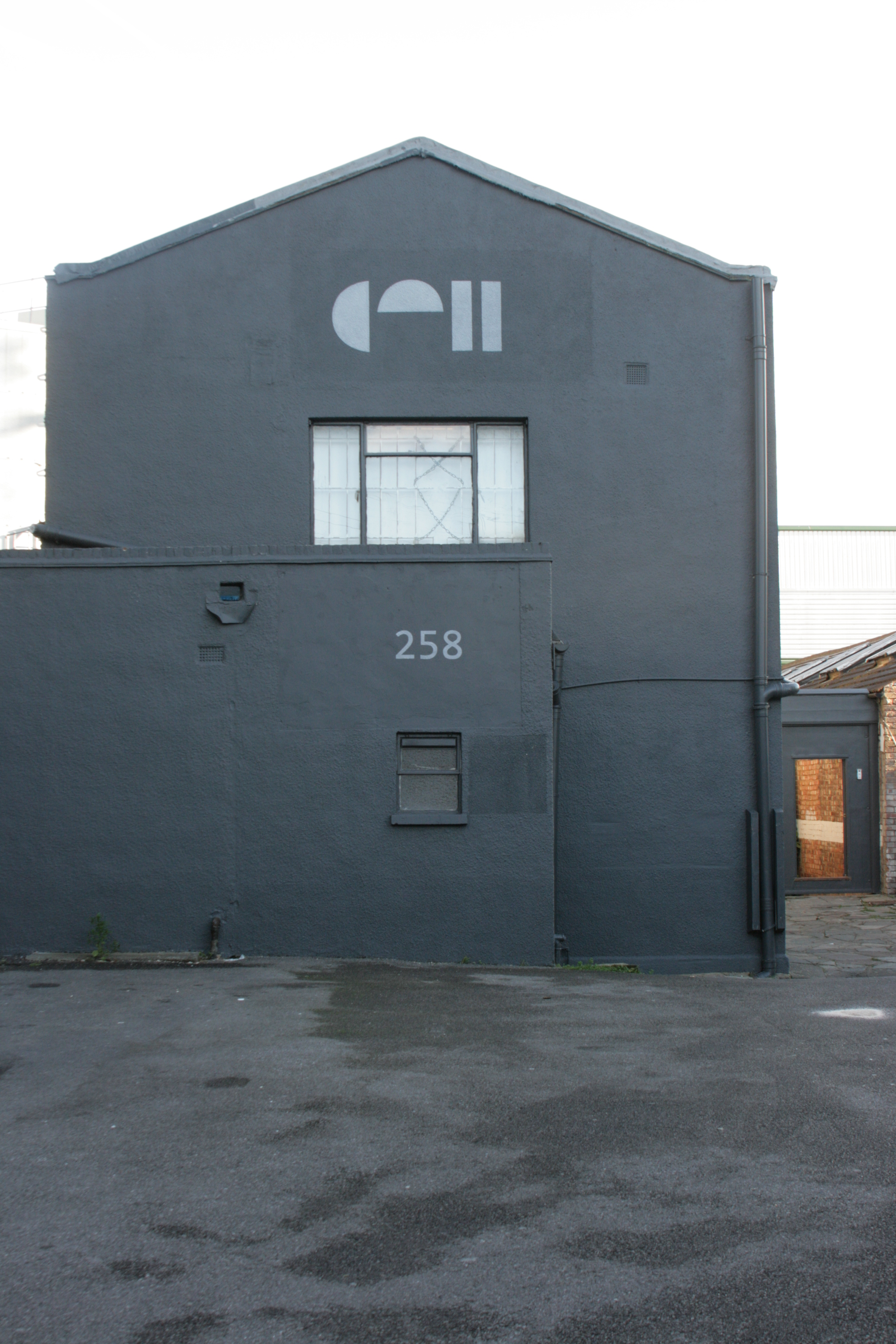
- Established: 2000
- Location: 258 Cambridge Heath Road, London, E2 9DA
- Coordinates: 51.5332°N 0.0565°W
- Type: Non-profit art gallery
- Public transit access: No. 26, 55, 106, 254, 388, D6 buses; Cambridge Heath Overground
- Website: ww.cellprojects.org

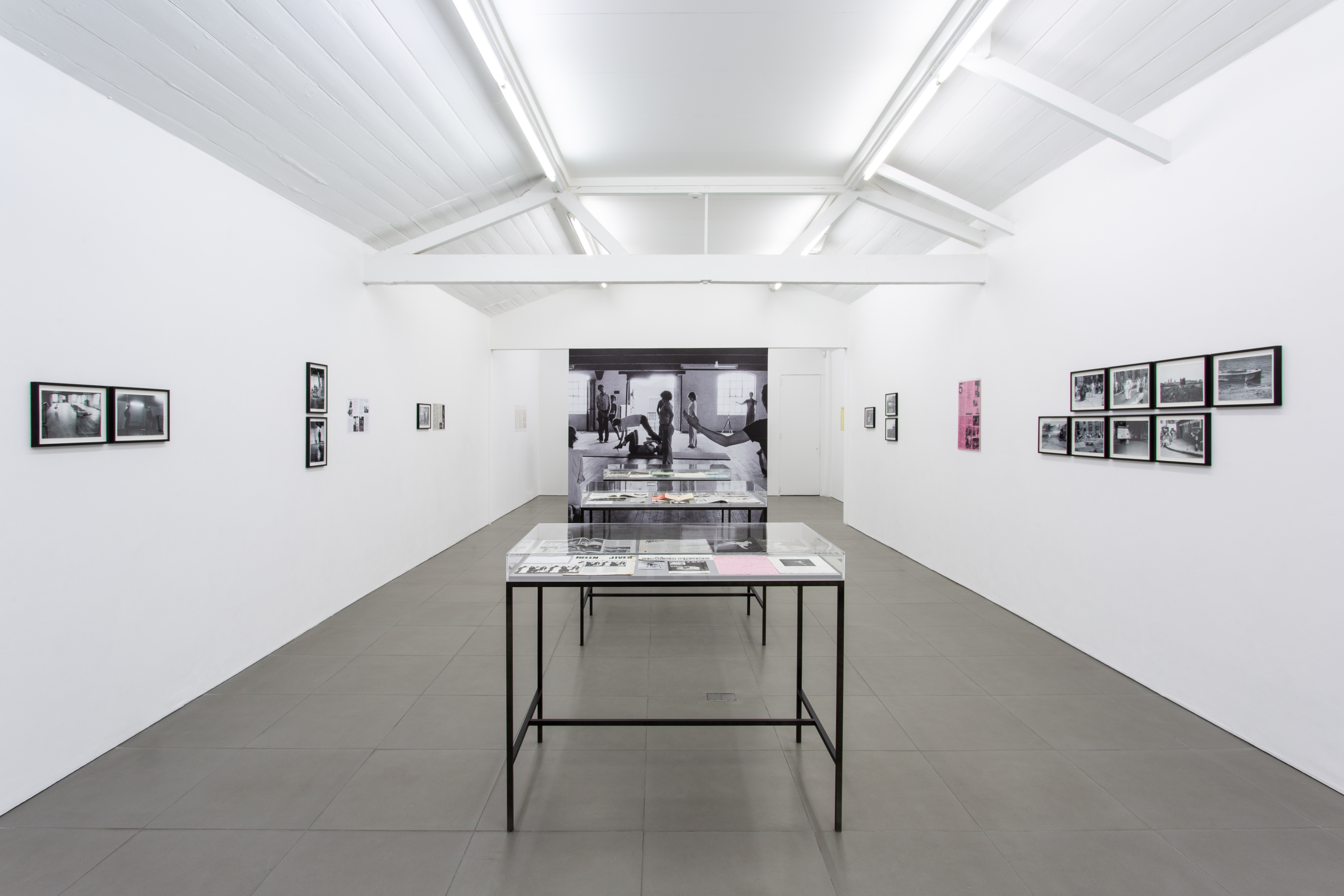
X6 Dance Space (1976-80)- Liberation Notes, Installation view, 2020, Cell Project Space

Cell Project Space is a not-for-profit gallery space and workspace provider based in Cambridge Heath, London. Cell Project Space presents up to five exhibitions and three or four events per year, and supports the dissemination of artists' knowledge to the local community through workshops.

== History ==
Cell Project Space and Studios, established in 1999, and charity arm Cell Foundation, founded in 2014, are an affordable artists work space providing leasehold work space to 1097 artists and designer-makers at 7 sites / 147,000 sq ft of B1 work space in east and South East London. As an independent not for profit gallery all funds raised are used solely for the development of artists’ projects and the gallery's public programme.

== Programme ==
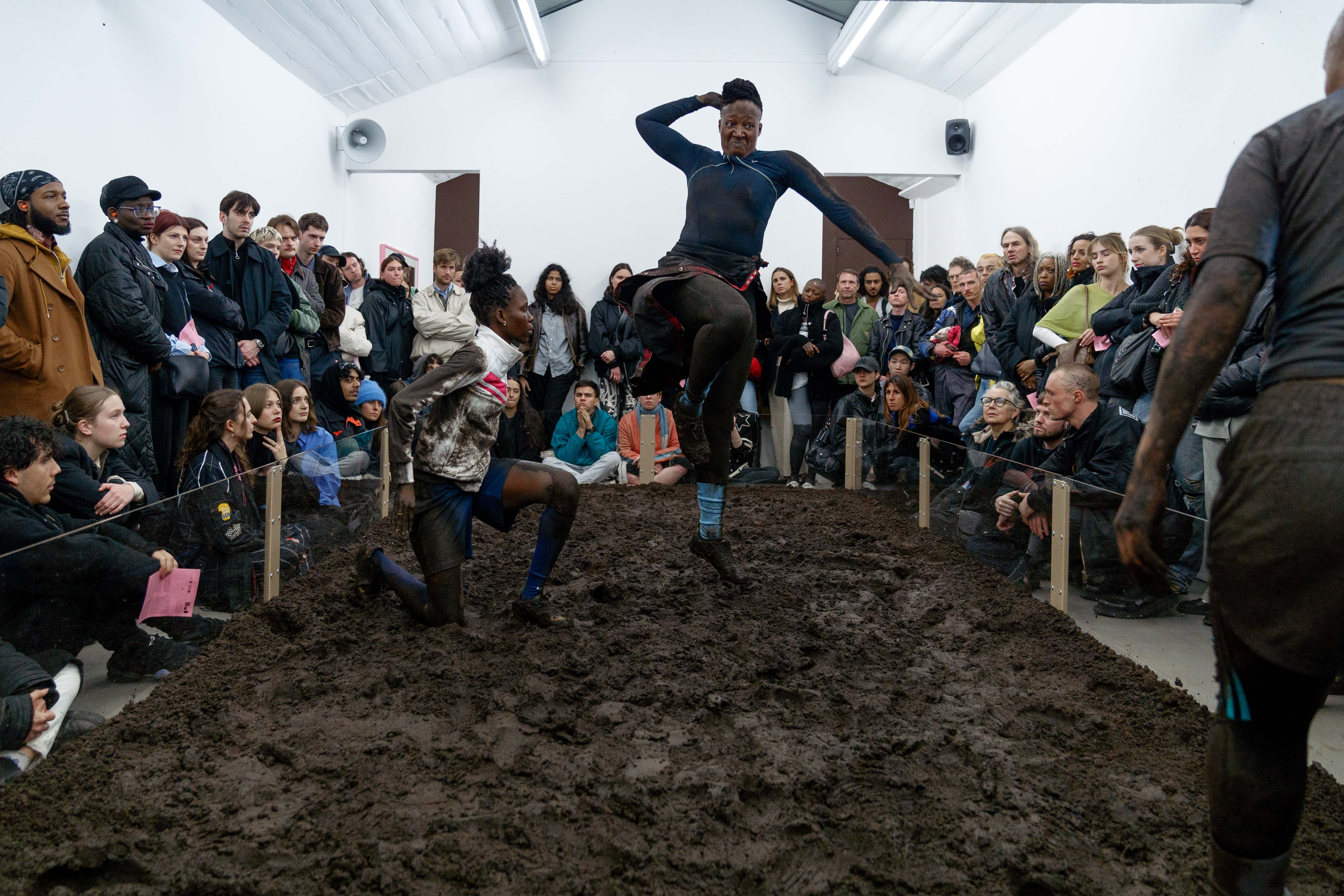
Performance of "Capital" by Coumba Samba, 2024

Cell Project Space runs a regular programme of exhibitions, talks & events. Past solo exhibitions include, X6 Dance Space (1976-80): Liberation Notes, THE FARMYARD IS NOT A VIOLENT PLACE AND I LOOK EXACTLY LIKE JUDY GARLAND, Alex Margo Arden & Caspar Heinemann, Eglė Kulbokaitė & Dorota Gawęda YGRG14X: reading with the single hand V, Anna-Sophie Berger, Rosa Aiello & Patricia L. Boyd, Emanuel Almborg, Alan Michael, Dorota Gawęda & Eglė Kulbokaitė, Angharad Williams & Mathis Gasser, Julia Crabtree & William Evans, Mimosa Echard, Jenna Bliss & Gili Tal, Ghislaine Leung, Josh Bitelli, Barbara T. Smith, Yuri Pattison, Rachel Reupke, Peles Empire, Laura Buckley, Anne de Vries, Mark Aerial Waller, Iain Ball, Angelo Plessas, Benedict Drew, Eddie Peake, Jessica Warboys, Celia Hempton, Natalie Dray and Celine Condorelli.

The programme has received numerous reviews and press coverage in Art Forum, AQNB, Frieze, Art Monthly, Mousse, The Guardian, Dazed, Studio International and Art Review.

=== Exhibitions ===
- Gili Tal + Jenna Bliss’s, Step into Spring, Cell Project Space, 2017, AQNB
- X6 Dance Space (1976–80): Liberation Notes, Cell Project Space, Philomena Epps, Flash Art 2020
- Joins, Rosa Aiello and Patricia L. Boyd, Amy Budd, Frieze 2019
- Shenece Oretha, Mohammad Tayyeb, Kareem Reid, Frieze, 2020
- Olu Ogunnaike, London Plain, Cell Project Space Frieze, Jamila Prowse, Frieze 2020
- Queer Correspondence, Cell Project Space, Kevin Brazil, Frieze 2020
- Queer Correspondence, Cell Project Space, Kevin Brazil, Frieze 2020
- Alex Margo Arden & Caspar Heinemann, THE FARMYARD IS NOT A VIOLENT PLACE AND I LOOK EXACTLY LIKE JUDY GARLAND, Cell Project Space, Isabel Wander, Frieze, 2020
- Bryan Giuseppi Rodriguez Cambana, Ópera de Balcón, at Cell Project Space, 2022, Art Viewer
- Peng Zuqiang, Sideways Looking at London’s Cell Project Space, Marv Recinto, Art Review magazine
- Nicola Frimpong, Cell Project Space, Ding Dong Frimpong! Contemporary Art Daily, 2022] Tensors | Mousse Magazine | Cell Project Space Cudelice Brazelton IV, Cell Project Space, 2022, Mousse Magazine
- Agnė Jokšė & Anastasia Sosunova,Dance As You Wrestle, Cell Proeject Space, 2022, Alice Bucknell, Art Review Magazine
- Niklas Taleb, Solo Yolo, Cell Project Space, 2023, Marcus Verhagen E-Flux
- Niklas Taleb, Cell Project Space, 2023, Daniel Neofetou, Artforum Magazine
- Ksenia Pedan, Reversion, Cell Project Space, 2023 Emergent Magazine
- Josefin Arnell & Max Göran, brave and pathetic is better than drowning in shame, Cell Project Space, Zérodeux 02
- Coumba Samba at Cell Project Space, 2024, Antonia Blocker, PAM Magazine
- Coumba Samba, Capital, Cell Project Space, 2024, Mousse magazine
- Nina Cristante, The Richest Man In Babylon, 2024, Cell Project Space, Emergent magazine
- Jack Jubb, Later Works, 2024, Cell Project Space, Art Viewer
- Majd Abdel Hamid, Cell Project Space 2025, Canvas magazine
- Tanja Widmann Johannes Porsch Produced by -1, plus One" Cell Project Space, 2025, Mousse Magazine
- Ruoru Mou, Fortunate, 2025, Cell Project Space
- Ruoru Mou, Fortunate, 2025, Cell Project Space
- Teatro Grottesco presents Elizabeth Wright, 2026, Cell Project Space
- LA Timpa, Come Back, 2026, Cell Project Space
