= Alex Margo Arden =

English artist (born 1994)

- Born: 1994 (age 31–32); Croydon, Greater London, England
- Education: Central Saint Martins; Goldsmiths, University of London (BA); Royal Academy Schools (MA)
- Occupation: Artist
- Years active: 2016–present

Alex Margo Arden (born 1994) is an English contemporary artist.

She won the Nicoletta Fiorucci Foundation Prize at Frieze London. In 2024, the Evening Standard named her one of London's most exciting young artists. In 2025, she was nominated for The Times Breakthrough at the Sky Arts Awards. She featured on the 2026 Attitude 101 list.

Her work is held in the permanent collections of the Royal Academy of Arts and the Arts Council Collection.

== Early life and education ==
Arden was born in Croydon, South London.

In 2013, Arden completed a Foundation course at Central Saint Martins. In 2016, she graduated from Goldsmiths, University of London, where she received the Hamad Butt Memorial Prize.

Later, from 2022 to 2025, Arden studied at the Royal Academy Schools.

== Work ==
Arden's work often involves a process of reinterpretation, re-staging and reconstruction of historical objects as a means of engaging with their histories. For her 2023 work Rock Paper Scissors, for example, she reconstructed the collages made on Islington Library books of Kenneth Halliwell and Joe Orton from 1959-1962, as a means of engaging with queer histories. In her 2025 exhibition she also reproduced and re-staged several famous artworks that have been the target of direct action by protestors.

Arden's work is research and conceptually-driven, so she works across a variety of media including sculpture, installation, painting, drawing, analogue photography, collage and performance "depending on what the idea calls for".

Arden's work Accounts used mannequins of male workers from the National Motor Museum tied together with a tug-of-war rope, and sat in front of a painting titled Daily Departmental Accident Record on the wall.

== Career ==
Upon graduating from Goldsmiths in 2016, Arden had an installation in the display window of VFDalston for World AIDS Day. The following year, she took part in her first group exhibition at Serf in Leeds. Arden also gained prominence on Instagram, where she shared her vintage-inspired personal aesthetic.

In 2019 and 2020, Arden collaborated with Caspar Heinemann on the exhibition and corresponding performance play THE FARMYARD IS NOT A VIOLENT PLACE AND I LOOK EXACTLY LIKE JUDY GARLAND at Cell Project Space. This was followed by Arden and Heinemann's second play Among My Souvenirs which was performed in 2021 at Barnens Scen in the Folkets park, Malmö, Sweden.

With Ginny on Frederick, Arden held her solo exhibition All Clear in 2022 and took part in Marseille's Art-o-rama 2023. Arden's first Royal Academy of Arts exhibition in 2023 featured collages made from books by Kenneth Halliwell and Joe Orton. Attention Restoration followed later that year at Quench Gallery in Margate.

In 2025, Arden had a solo exhibition at London's Auto Italia South East titled Safety Curtain, which recreated artwork targeted by climate protestors behind a protective glaze. In the same year, she was nominated for the Times Breakthrough Award at the 2025 Sky Arts Awards.

In October 2025, Arden returned to Ginny on Frederick with her presentation By All Accounts for Frieze London. The installation Accounts repurposes decommissioned male mannequins from the National Motor Museum; it sat in front of Daily Departmental Accident Record on the wall. Accounts (2025) was acquired by the Arts Council Collection. Sofia Hallström of Wallpaper named Arden a standout artist of Frieze 2025. Arden won the fair's inaugural Nicoletta Fiorucci Foundation Prize. This involved the exhibition Nothing Personal at the Nicoletta Fiorucci Foundation, London, curated by Vittoria de Franchis, from 2026-27. The exhibition will involve the re-staging of the personal property of Amy Winehouse. Arden has engaged with Winehouse previously in her work, for example in her works Shoes Said to Have Belonged to Amy Winehouse (2024) and Perfume said to have belonged to Amy Winehouse (2024) shown at the group exhibition On Feeling at The Approach.

== Exhibitions ==
=== Solo exhibitions ===
Year	Title	Institution	Location	Notes	Ref
2022	All Clear	Ginny on Frederick	London		
2022	Responsibility, Responsibility, Responsibility	Art-o-rama	Marseille		
2023	Attention Restoration	Quench Gallery	Margate		
2023	Rock Paper Scissors	Royal Academy of Arts	London		
2025	Safety Curtain	Auto Italia South East	London		
2025	Crisis Acts	Royal Academy of Arts	London		
2025	By All Accounts	Frieze London	London		
2026	True as Good	diez	Amsterdam		
2026	Nothing Personal	Nicoletta Fiorucci Foundation	London		

=== Group exhibitions ===
Year	Title	Venue	Location	Notes	Ref
2017	A Vanitas Painting	Serf	Leeds		
2018	Light Blue	The Royal Standard	Liverpool		
2021	I Am Still Learning	La Casa Encendida	Madrid		
2023	Tenfold	St James's Church, Piccadilly	London		
2024	How to Destroy Angels	Horse Hospital	London		
2024	Rouge Ravager	Bio Skandia	Stockholm		
2024	Vampire Problem?	N/A Gallery	Seoul		
2024	Channel	Centre d'Art Contemporain de Nîmes	Nîmes		
2024	Color of Pomegranates	Gallery Artbeat	Tbilisi		
2024	On Feeling	The Approach Gallery	London		
2024	Recital	Arcadia Missa	London		
2025	The Syzygy	Champ Lacombe	Biarritz		
2026	Re/Enactments	Coulisse	Stockholm		
2026	Summer Exhibition	Royal Academy of Arts	London		
2026	Case History	Vardaxoglou	London		
2026	Marilyn Monroe: A Portrait	National Portrait Gallery	London		
2026–2028	British Art Show 10: A Chorus of Strangers (2026–)	Multiple locations		Curated by Ekow Eshun	

=== Performances ===
Year	Title	Institution	Location	Notes	Ref
2019	THE FARMYARD IS NOT A VIOLENT PLACE AND I LOOK EXACTLY LIKE JUDY GARLAND	Cell Project Space	London	With Caspar Heinemann	
2021	Among My Souvenirs	Barnens Scen	Folkets park, Malmö	With Caspar Heinemann	

== Collections ==
Arden's work is held in the public collections of:

- Royal Academy of Arts
- Arts Council Collection

== Awards ==
Arden has been nominated and achieved the following awards:

- 2025 – Nominated – The Times Breakthrough Award, Sky Arts Awards
- 2025 – Nicoletta Fiorucci Foundation Prize at Frieze London
- 2025 – Annabel Paradise Award for Sculpture, Royal Academy Schools
- 2025 – André Dunoyer de Segonzac Hon RA Travel Scholarship, Royal Academy Schools
- 2024 – Landseer Prize, Royal Academy Schools
- 2015 – Hamad Butt Memorial Prize, Goldsmiths
