= Landon Metz =

American abstract painter and conceptual artist

- Born: Phoenix, Arizona
- Known for: Contemporary art, painting, sound
- Movement: Contemporary art
- Website: landonmetz.com

Landon Metz is a New York-based abstract painter and conceptual artist, best known for his repetitive patterns, fluid use of negative space, and exploration of presence through his work across media. Often echoing the architecture around it, Metz's poured compositions are ritualistic in their process and meditative in their impact.

== Early life ==
Metz grew up in Scottsdale, Arizona, born to parents of Mexican, Italian, Dutch and French heritage. Metz cites the Arizona desert as a primary influence for his use of color.

Metz's paternal grandparents changed their son's surname from Gonzalez to Metz to shield him from racism that was prevalent in Chicago during the 1930s.

While he was living in Vancouver, B.C., Metz got married, then relocated to Los Angeles where he attended two semesters at ArtCenter College of Design before dropping out. Metz, his wife, Hannah Kristina Metz, and their son currently live in a 19th-century Gothic Revival Church in Brooklyn Heights.

== Work ==
Across disciplines, Metz’s work resists traditional hierarchies of medium or form. Rather than treating art objects as endpoints, his practice centers on creating conditions for presence, reflection, and a dissolving of the boundary between other and self. His process is characterized by humility, discipline, and a reverence for material and immaterial phenomena alike.

=== Paintings ===
Metz's painted work is composed from light washes of a custom dye he creates himself then paints in geometric shapes onto raw canvases. He repeats the process of painting the shapes several times on multiple canvases so that the canvases can be installed together forming repetitive patterns, or individually. Inspired by Color Field Painters such as Helen Frankenthaler, Morris Louis and Kenneth Noland, Metz incorporates stain techniques and the interplay between the weave of the canvas and the saturation of pigment. His earlier work largely incorporated single color patterns, and his more recent work has expanded to include more color gradations.

In an interview with Forbes in 2018, Metz described his process stating, “There's this a core sentiment in my practice that's dealing with notions of authorship and relinquishing formal roles and hierarchies of authorship, so let's say that the most simple place that it becomes apparent is in the materials. It's dye, that's the paint, so it's really merging with the fibers of the canvas and the way the canvas reacts and pushes back against the medium, you get this natural vernacular that is beyond my control. There's a lot of chance in the depth of all these little holes.”

=== Other media ===
Metz has produced a number of works in other media, including sculpture, furniture, sound, film and poetry. He produced a film and furniture for an exhibition at Andersen's Contemporary in 2015 and, in 2018, he exhibited a sound work alongside a series of sculptures in stone at Von Bartha Gallery, Basel. In 2022, Zinck Editions published Metz's untitled edition of 30 with four artist proofs, in mirror polished bronze. His art across media is more of an act of presence and devotion than a physical object.

=== Sound ===
In 2023, Metz released his debut album, Six Days at the Orange House, through Sensitive Records. Recorded in the wake of significant life changes the artist experienced, the album explores the relationship between silence and sound.

== Solo exhibitions ==
Metz's work has been the subject of solo exhibitions at his representing galleries—Sean Kelly Gallery, New York and Los Angeles; Von Bartha, Basel and Copenhagen; Galleria Minini, Brescia and Milan; and Waddington Custot, London.

=== Michael Jackson Penthouse, 2014 ===
Metz's first painting-based installation was hosted by the Retrospective Gallery, Hudson, NY in 2014. The artist's paintings were hung to engage with the architecture and encircle the viewer in an immersive experience.

=== Landon Metz, 2015 ===
In 2015, James Fuentes Gallery presented an installation of Metz's first shaped canvases, hung in a manner to emphasize the architecture of the gallery and disorient the viewer's understanding of the space.

=== &, 2016 ===
Continuing to produce shaped canvases in 2016, Metz's work was the subject of two simultaneous solo exhibitions at Galleria Massimo Minini, Brescia, and Francesca Minini, Milan, where he presented his first 3D, two-part paintings.

=== Asymmetrical Symmetry, 2018 ===
Metz's site-responsive exhibition, Asymmetrical Symmetry, hosted by Sean Kelly Gallery, New York in 2018, was conceived in response to the gallery's newly renovated space, designed by Toshiko Mori. For this exhibition, Metz utilized every component of the gallery, including the walls, floors and the ceiling.

=== Love Songs, 2021 ===
In 2021, the UK gallery Waddington Custot hosted a solo exhibition of Metz's paintings. Featuring work he created during the global COVID-19 pandemic, this exhibition emphasized the ability of art to provide mental and visual escapism.

=== A Different Kind of Paradise, 2022 ===
While Metz's most common multi-panel format is the diptych, his largest work, titled MMXXII XL, was produced for the exhibition A Different Kind of Paradise, at Sean Kelly Gallery, New York. The work consists of eight adjoining panels, each 80” tall by 64” wide, and references the panoramic hanging of Claude Monet’s Water Lilies at the Musée de l'Orangerie in Paris.

=== Additional exhibitions ===
In 2014, Metz was the artist in residence at the Fondazione Antonio Dalle Nogare in Bolzano, Italy. In 2018, his work was the subject of a solo exhibition at Museo Pietro Canonica in Rome. Metz was featured in a group exhibition at the Nassau County Museum of Art in New York, and Greffes, curated by Pier Paolo Pancotto at Villa Medici in Rome. In 2022, Metz's work was shown alongside paintings by Morris Louis at the Paul Kasmin Gallery in New York.

== Collaborations ==
In 2022, Finnish textile and clothing company Marimekko announced a collaboration with Metz: Marimekko x Landon Metz. The capsule line included dresses, shirts, a skirt, and scarf with prints based on Metz's artworks, emphasizing the connection between art and fashion.

The artist collaborated with New York clothing company, Stòffa, on the design of a cotton suit, “EDITION 003,” in 2021.

Metz produced the artwork for Kasper Bjørke Quartet's album The Fifty Eleven Project (2018).

== Publications ==
Metz's work and studio life have been the subject of publications by Mousse, Hatje Cantz Verlag, Libraryman, and Vimmerby Rinkeby.

While preparing for his exhibition Michael Jackson Penthouse, Metz was commissioned to photograph his artistic process for the Libraryman publication, West Street Studio: Landon Metz. The book included a conversation between Metz and Diego Cortez, as well as a poem written by Metz. A special edition of 25 copies included a woodblock print, and the volume's slipcase was upholstered in an original dye and canvas painting.

== Podcast ==
Metz co-hosted the podcast Abundance Zine with writer Christopher Schreck, where they facilitated conversations with creative thinkers about a range of topics across disciplines. Together they interviewed Dan Colen, Raul de Nieves, Laraaji, and Carly Mark of Puppets and Puppets.
