= Karim Noureldin =

Karim Noureldin (born 1967 in Zurich, Switzerland) is a Swiss visual artist.

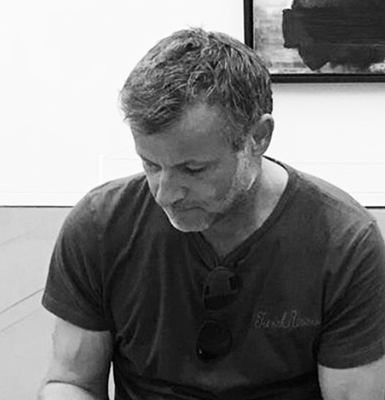
Photo of Artist

== Biography ==
Noureldin studied at the Zürcher Hochschule der Künste Zurich (1988–1989) and at Hochschule für Design und Kunst Basel HGK/University of Art and Design Basel (1990–1993). From 1994 - 2000 he lived in New York, after 2001 in Rome, from 2005-2006 in London and Cairo. He lives and works currently in Lausanne, Switzerland.

In 2002 until 2024 he was appointed Associated Professor for Visual Arts at the University of Art and Design École cantonale d'art de Lausanne in Lausanne, Switzerland. Being member of various jury commission in art institutions, in 2017 he was appointed as supervisory board member of the Hermann and Margrit Rupf Foundation / Rupf Collection, Bern. and since 2019 also as supervisory board member of the Theodor Bally Estate Foundation, Aarau.

== Work ==
Around 1994 Noureldin initiated a contemporary drawing technique based on an abstract artistic vocabulary. Since then he works in the field of sculptures, photos, textiles, ceramics and large site-specific installations in a variety of corporate and public environments as well as international museums and contemporary art galleries as well as with corporate and cultural institutions and state agencies, as Studio Karim Noureldin collaborating with architects in various Art & Architecture projects.

== Projects ==
Notable and recents exhibition projects include at Galeria Elba Benitez, Madrid (2026), von Bartha, Basel (2025, 2018, 2016, 2011, 2009), Ribot arte contemporanea, Milan (2018), Bernhard Knaus Fine Art, Frankfurt (2016), Centre d'Art Yverdon CACY (2015), KunstZeugHaus, Zurich (2015), Kunstmuseum Villa Zanders, Bergisch-Gladbach (2015), Gisela Clement Gallery, Bonn (2014, 2012), Kunstmuseum Bonn (2007), Musée d’art moderne et contemporain MAMCO Geneva (2015, 2005), Kunstmuseum Winterthur (2004), Fri Art - Centre d'Art Contemporain (2003), Lucas Schoormans New York (2001, 1999), Kunsthalle Basel (2003, 2001), Kunstmuseum Thun (2000), the Swiss Institute New York (1997), Holly Solomon Gallery New York (1994), among others.

He participated in numerous international group shows, among others at Ortigia Contemporanea, Syracuse (2024), Nature Morte Gallery, New Delhi (2023), The Sculpture Park, Jaipur (2023), Museum für Konkrete Kunst, Ingolstadt (2020), LWL Museum für Kunst und Kultur, Münster (2018), Aargauer Kunsthaus, Aarau (2018), Kunstmuseum Basel, Basel (2016), Musée des Beaux-Arts de Cambrai, Cambrai (2016), MCBA Musée Cantonal des Beaux-Arts, Lausanne (2015 & 2019), Musée Jenisch, Vevey (2015), Museum Oskar Reinhart, Winterthurc (2015), Kunstmuseum Vaduz, Liechtenstein (2011), waterside contemporary, London (2011), Aargauer Kunsthaus, Aarau (2016, 2011), Gisela Clement Gallery, Bonn (2013, 2011), Waterside Project space, London (2010), Musée Rath, Geneva (2010), l' Espace de l'art concret-Donation Albers-Honegger, Mouans-Sartoux, France (2008), Forde - Espace d'art contemporain, Geneva (2007), The Drawing Room, London (2007), CAN - Centre d’Art, Neuchatel (2006), Helmhaus, Zurich (2005), Kunstmuseum Thun (2003), CAN - Centre d’Art, Neuchatel (2003), Kunstmuseum Solothurn (2004), Margaretha Roeder Gallery, New York, Fri-Art - Centre d'Art Contemporain Fribourg (2002), Kunsthalle Basel (2001), Kunstmuseum Basel, (1999), The Swiss Institute New York (1997)

Since 2004, he has collaborated with numerous international architect firms such as: Herzog&deMeuron architects, Basel, Müller Sigrist architects, Zurich, Make architects, London among others.

== Literature ==
Monographic literature:

- Végh, Christina (2013). Karim Noureldin. Moderne Kunst Nürnberg. ISBN 978-3-86984-410-7.
- Wechsler, Max (2009). MISR/Karim Noureldin - Edition der Tage. ISBN 978-3-9520525-4-9.
- Ralf Christofori, Ralf (2007). Karim Noureldin - Unbekannte Zonen der Zeichnung - Kunstmuseum Bonn. ISBN 978-3-929790-86-3.
- Wechsler, Max (2004). AIRE - Zeichnung/Raum/Welt: zu den Arbeiten von Karim Noureldin - Kunstmuseum Winterthur - MAMCO Musée d'art moderne et contemporain, Geneva
- Schuppli, Madeleine (2001). Karim Noureldin -Typologie der räumlichen Erinnerung - Kunstmuseum Thun. ISBN 3-906537-03-X.
- Kurzmeyer, Roman (2001). Karim Noureldin - Räume, ortlos - Kunstmuseum Thun. ISBN 3-906537-03-X.
- Koepplin, Dieter (1997). Karim Noureldin - Die Frage nach dem denkbaren Ganzen - The Swiss Institute New York

Secondary literature:

- Kurzmeyer, Roman / Malsch, Friedemann (2011). Example Switzerland. ISBN 978-3-7757-3255-0.
- Tissot, Karine (2011). Les objets de l'art contemporain. ISBN 978-2-940408-45-0.
- Enkell Julliard, Julie (2010). Voici un dessin suisse - Swiss Drawings 1990-2010. ISBN 978-3-03764-100-2.
- Notter, Eveline (2007). Day after Day - Francis Baudevin/Karim Noureldin - Fri-Art Centre d'Art Contemporain - p.341-345. ISBN 978-2-9700083-9-2.
- de Pury, Gauthier (2007). Acceleration - Kunstart - JRP Ringier - p.110-111. ISBN 978-3-905770-64-3.
- Vögele, Christoph (2004). Bunt ist meine Lieblingsfarbe - Kunstmuseum Solothurn - Kehrer - p.118-119. ISBN 3-936636-33-8.
- Omlin, Sibylle (2002). Kunst aus der Schweiz- Kunstschaffen und Kunstsystem im 19. und 20.Jahrhundert - Pro Helvetia - p.136-119. ISBN 3-907622-51-0.
- Christofori, Ralf (2002). Persönliche Pläne - The Poetics of Non-Referential Space - Kunsthalle Basel - p.54-56. ISBN 3-7965-1879-6.
- Meyer, Franz (1999). Schenkung z.D. an Dieter Koepplin - Kunstmuseum Basel - p.100. ISBN 3-7204-0119-7.
