= Aurelie Nemours =

French painter

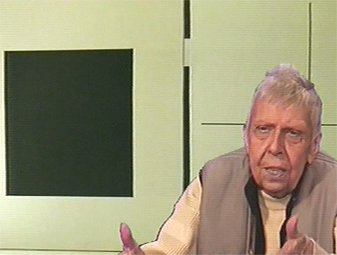
- Born: 29 October 1910; Paris, France
- Died: 27 January 2005 (aged 94); Paris, France
- Known for: Painting; poetry
- Movement: Abstract art
- Spouse: Auguste Nemours (m. 1936)

Aurelie Nemours, Diagram of The alignment of the XXI century

Aurelie Nemours (29 October 1910 – 27 January 2005) was a French painter who made abstract geometrical paintings and was highly influenced by De Stijl, or neoplasticism.

== Biography ==
Aurelie Nemours was born 29 October 1910 in Paris, France.

In 1929 she enrolled in the École du Louvre.

In 1936, she married Auguste Nemours.

In 1941 Nemours attended to the Andre Lhote Academy. In 1945, she began writing poetry. While for the first time at the Salon of Sacred Art she exhibited in 1946 until 1979.

Nemours established her style in 1949 she then used her form of media to conduct research on the interplay of lines and their relationship to colored surfaces, angles, the point of geometric shapes, horizontal and vertical.

From 1949 through 1992 Nemours participated in the Salon des Réalités Nouvelles.

In 1950, Midi la lune, her collection of poems was published.

In the late 1950s Nemours traveled to Haiti.

Nemours exhibited at a variety of venues culminating in a retrospective at the Centre Georges Pompidou in 2004.

Nemours died 27 January 2005 in Paris.

== Artistic style ==
Before any development, she made measurements, studies, sketches and drawings. Then she went into the essential, black and white or color; for her, the color is "pure energy." Following an apprenticeship, she developed her vision at various studios and most notably Fernand Léger’s. Inspired by Léger, Nemour softens her edges of shapes and lines, imbuing her canvases with sensuality of the act of painting itself. She worked in black and white and bold colors, and honed her visual vocabulary to horizontal and vertical planes, right angles, lines, rectangles, and ultimately, the square, her ideal representation of universal harmony. She works in series thus from 1965- 1970: the square becomes the key size of her work. Although she stopped painting in 2002, she is honored now and in the future by the artists who have worked consistently and innovatively in the field of thought asserting their own vision.

There have been several articles about Aurelie Nemours, including '11th Edition of Artparis Welcomed 43.000 Visitors' written for ArtDaily in 2009. As well numerous works by the artist have been sold at auction, including 'RYTHME DU MILLIMETRE SB' sold at Artcurial Briest-Poulain-F. Tajan 'Contemporary Art 2 ' in 2012 for $91,005.

Nemours' work was included in the 2021 exhibition Women in Abstraction at the Centre Pompidou.
