= Sarah Oppenheimer =

American visual artist

- Born: 1972 (age 53–54); Austin, Texas, United States
- Education: Yale University, Brown University
- Known for: Installation art, sculpture
- Website: Sarah Oppenheimer

Sarah Oppenheimer, 33-D, Aluminum, glass and architecture, Total dimensions variable. Installation view: Kunsthaus Baselland, Switzerland, 2014.

Sarah Oppenheimer (born 1972, in Austin, Texas) is a New York City-based contemporary artist that explores the articulations and experiences of built spaces. Her work transforms the built environment to disrupt, subvert or shuffle visitors' visual and bodily experiences.

== Career ==
Oppenheimer exhibits her work internationally. The titles of her works are generated from a numerical typology. Each digit in a title tracks transactions and flow between spatial zones, and together, form a key to the orientation of the work within the built environment.

In her early exhibitions at The Drawing Center (2002) and Queens Museum (2004), Oppenheimer explored spatial navigation and interior architecture. In the late 2000s, Oppenheimer changed the boundaries between exhibition spaces, displacing views within and outside galleries (e.g., Saint Louis Art Museum, 2008; Museum of Contemporary Art San Diego, 2009). 610-3356 (Mattress Factory, 2008) used a roughly seven-foot-long hole in museum's fourth floor which tunneled down to a third-floor window with an outside view.

Sarah Oppenheimer, 610-3356, Plywood and existing architecture, fourth floor opening dimensions: 84" × 16", Mattress Factory, Pittsburgh, 2008.

In D-33 (P.P.O.W., 2012) and 33-D (Kunsthaus Baselland, 2014), Oppenheimer modified the boundary between three contiguous rooms, inserting a pair of slanting openings at the spaces' corners. W-120301 (Baltimore Museum of Art, 2012) was Oppenheimer's first permanent work in a museum.S-399390 (Mudam, 2016) featuring two glass passageways that changed positions in the museum's exhibition space, modifying visitors' movements and views.

Sarah Oppenheimer, S-337473, Aluminum, steel, glass and existing architecture, Total dimensions variable. Installation view: Wexner Center for the Arts, Columbus, 2017.

During a two-year residency at the Wexner Center for the Arts, Oppenheimer developed a human-powered apparatus, which was patented. It was used in three locations: S-281913 (Perez Art Museum Miami, 2016), S-337473 (Wexner Center for the Arts, 2017), and S-334473 (Mass MoCA, 2019). N-01 (Kunstmuseum Thun, 2020) featured a dynamic exhibition system of mechanically interconnected thresholds.

== Awards and collections ==
Oppenheimer has been awarded fellowships from the John S. Guggenheim Foundation (2007), American Academy in Rome (2010–1), and New York Foundation for the Arts (2016, 2010, 2006). She has also received awards from Anonymous was a Woman (2013), the Joan Mitchell Foundation (2011), Louis Comfort Tiffany Foundation (2009), and American Academy of Arts and Letters (2007), among others. Her work belongs to the public art collections of Mudam, Perez Art Museum Miami, Museum of Contemporary Art San Diego, Mattress Factory, Baltimore Museum of Art, and Brown University.
