= Katy Moran =

English artist

Katy Moran is a British contemporary artist whose work is in the collection of the Arts Council, The Tate, The San Francisco Museum of Modern Art, The Walker Art Center, and the Government Art Collection, amongst others. She is represented by Pippy Houldsworth Gallery, London.

Moran's first solo exhibition was for Stuart Shave/Modern Art, in London, 2006. Her first institutional solo exhibition was at Middlesbrough Institute of Modern Art in 2008. In 2025 she had her first solo exhibition at Pippy Houldsworth Gallery.

She has also had solo exhibitions at Andrea Rosen Gallery, The Wexner Center for the Arts, Parasol Unit, Sperone Westwater, Station Gallery, and the Tate St Ives.

== Early life and education ==
Moran was born in Manchester to art teacher parents. She graduated from Leeds Metropolitan University in 1998 with a BA Honours degree in Graphic Art. She received an MA in painting from the Royal College of Art in 2005.

== Exhibitions ==
=== Solo exhibitions ===
- 2006: Stuart Shave/Modern Art, London; Grusenmeyer Art Gallery, Deurie, France.
- 2008: Katy Moran: Paintings, Middlesbrough Institute of Modern Art, UK; Anthony Meier Fine Arts, San Francisco, California, USA; Andrea Rosen Gallery, New York City.
- 2009: Contemporary Fine and Applied Arts: 1928–2009, Tate St Ives, St Ives, UK; Stuart Shave/Modern Art, London; Galleria II Capricorno, Venice, Italy.
- 2010: Six Solos, Katy Moran, Wexner Center for the Arts, Columbus, Ohio, USA.
- 2011: Andrea Rosen Gallery, New York City.
- 2013: Stuart Shave/Modern Art, London; Douglas Hyde Gallery, Dublin, Ireland, UK.
- 2015: Katy Moran, Parasol unit foundation for contemporary art, London; Andrea Rosen Gallery, New York City
- 2017: Stuart Shave/Modern Art, London
- 2019: I want to live in the afternoon of that day, Sperone Westwater, New York City
- 2020: Recent Paintings, Stuart Shave/Modern Art, London
- 2022: 300 sun days, Stuart Shave/Modern Art, London
- 2023: How to paint like an athlete, Sperone Westwater, New York, NY
- 2023: More Me, Station Gallery, Melbourne, Australia
- 2023: Let's get some AIR, Pippy Houldsworth Gallery, London

=== Group exhibitions ===
- 2005: Art Futures, Bloomberg Space, (Art Review magazine prize), London; Peculiar Encounters, Ec Artspace, London; New London Kicks, The Wooster Project, New York City; Morpho Eugenia, Museo di Stato, San Marino, Italy; MA Show, Royal College of Art, London; Man Drawing Prize, Royal College of Art, London.
- 2006: A Broken Arm, 303 Gallery, New York City; New Contemporaries 2006, London and Liverpool, UK (touring); Young Painters, Grusenmeyer Gallery, Deurle, Belgium; Primetime Painting: Young Art from London, Galerie Seitz, Berlin, Germany; Sunset in Athens II, Vamialis Gallery, Athens, Greece.
- 2007: Dining Room Show, Andrea Rosen Gallery, New York City; Old Space New Space, Gagosian Gallery, New York City; The Painting Show: Slipping Abstraction, Mead Gallery, Warwick Arts Centre, University of Warwick, Coventry, UK; Salon Nouveau, Galerie Engholm Engelhorn, Vienna, Austria.
- 2008: Art Now: Strange Solution, Tate Britain, London; Selections from the Orvitz Family Collection, ASU Art Museum, Tempe, Arizona, USA.
- 2009: Visible Invisible: Against the Security of the Real, Parasol unit foundation for contemporary art, London; We're Moving, Royal College of Art, London; Surface Reality, Laing Art Gallery, Newcastle, UK; Contemporary Fine Arts and Applied Arts: 1928–2009, Tate St Ives, St Ives, UK; Cave Painting, Gresham's Ghost, New York City.
- 2010: Tasters' Choice, Stephen Friedman, London; Le Tableau, Cheim & Read, New York City; Feint Art, Kunstverein Freiburg, Freiburg, Germany.
- 2011: Le Magasin-CNAC (Centre National d'Art Contemporain), Grenoble, France; Creating the New Century: Contemporary Art from the Dicke Collection, The Dayton Art Institute, Dayton, Ohio, USA.
- 2012: The Far and the Near: Replaying Art in St Ives, Tate St Ives, St Ives, UK; Contemporary Painting, 1960 to the Present: Selections from the SFMOMA Collection, SFMOMA, San Francisco, California, USA.
- 2013: A Personal Choice, by Bruna Aickelin, Galleria II Capricorno, Venice, Italy; Lloyds Club, London; Painter Painter, Walker Art Center, Minneapolis, Minnesota, USA; Inevitable Figuration, Centro per l'Arte Contemporanea Luigi Pecci, Prato, Italy.
- 2014: Somos Libres II. Works from the Mario Testino Collection, Pinacoteca Gianni e Marella, Agnelli, Turin, Italy
- 2015: Intimacy in Discourse: Reasonable and Unreasonable Sized Paintings, Mana Contemporary, Jersey City, New Jersey, USA; One Day, Something Happens: Paintings of People. A selection by Jennifer Higgie from The Arts Council Collection (England), Leeds Art Gallery, Leeds; Highlanes Gallery, Drogheda, Ireland; The Atkinson, Southport; Towner Art Gallery, Eastbourne; Second Chances, Aspen Art Museum, Aspen, Colorado, USA
- 2016: Theories of Modern Art, Modern Art, London
- 2018: Summer Exhibition, Modern Art, London; Surface Work, Victoria Miro, London; Virginia Woolf: An Exhibition Inspired by Her Writings, Tate St Ives, Cornwall; travelling to Pallant House Gallery, Chichester; Fitzwilliam Museum, Cambridge
- 2021: Fresh Faces from The Rachofsky Collection, SITE131, Dallas; WOOD WORKS: Raw, Cut, Carved, Covered, Sperone Westwater, New York
- 2022: Sabrina, curated by Russell Tovey, Sim-Smith, London; By a Thread, A.I., London

== Collections ==
- Arts Council Collection, London
- David Roberts Art Foundation, London
- Government Art Collection, London
- Goetz Collection, Munich
- Pinault Collection, Venice, Italy
- The Rachofsky Collection, Dallas, TX
- Royal College of Art, London
- Rubell Family Collection, Miami, Florida, USA
- Sammlung Goetz, Munich, Germany
- San Francisco Museum of Modern Art, San Francisco, California, USA
- Tate, London
- Walker Art Center, Minneapolis, Minnesota, USA
- Yale Center for British Art, New Haven, CT
- Zabludowicz Collection, London
