= Marianne Eigenheer =

Swiss artist (1945–2018)

- Born: 20 April 1945; Lucerne, Switzerland
- Died: 15 January 2018 (aged 72); Basel, Switzerland
- Occupation: Artist

Marianne Eigenheer (20 April 1945 in Lucerne – 15 January 2018 in Basel) was a Swiss artist. She was active both as an academic (including lecturer status and professorships at several art academies and colleges) and as a working artist who displayed works in Europe, Australia, and the United States. Her work was done mostly on small and large canvasses, including some wall drawings. She resided in Basel and London.

== Life ==
Before she turned her attention to art, Eigenheer was set on a career path to become a pianist. She began receiving piano lessons as a child (from 1950–1964). However, she herself wanted to become a composer, which was not possible at the time. Instead, she began drawing and painting after finishing school. In 1964, she completed her teaching certification in Aarau. Later, in 1970, she completed an art education diploma at the Lucerne School of Art and Design, Lucerne, and began working as an artist. From 1973–1976, she studied art history, anthropology and psychology at the Zurich University.

From 1971–88, she worked as a research assistant at the Museum of Art Lucerne with Jean-Christophe Ammann and later with Martin Kunz. In 1987, she was granted an artist residency in Tokyo and, in 2001/2002, the residency of the Landis & Gyr Foundation in London.

She was a lecturer and art professor at various art academies and colleges:1994–96 a teaching position at the Kunstpädagogisches Institut (Institute for Arts Education) at Goethe University Frankfurt; 1995–96 a professorship at the University of Art and Design, Offenbach; 1997–2007 a professorship for painting and graphic art at the State Academy of Fine Arts in Stuttgart. From 2003 to 2009 she was Professor and Director of the Institute for Curatorship and Education (ICE) at the Edinburgh College of Art (ECA) and was granted an honorary professorship at ECA in 2009. From 2011 to 2013, she was a tutor at the Royal College of Art in London. Marianne Eigenheer lived in Basel and London.

== Work ==
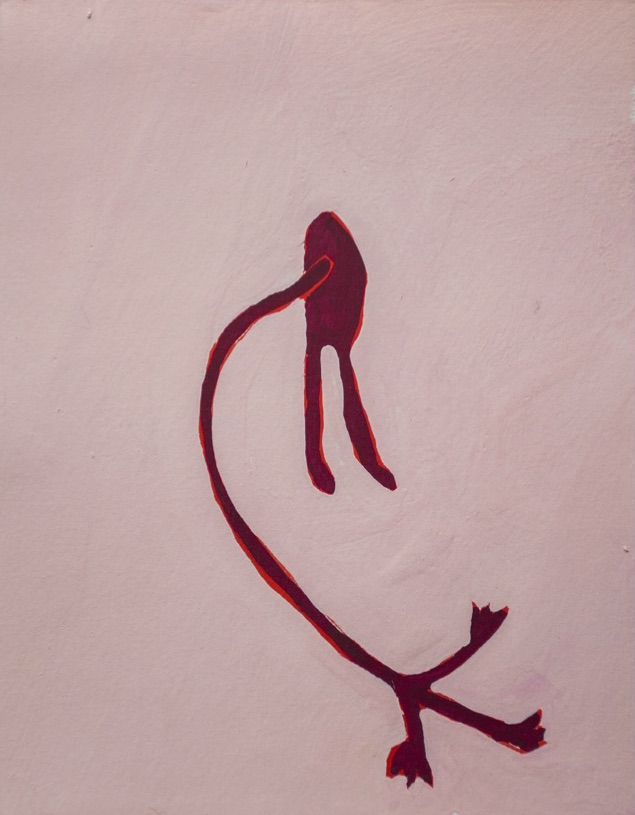
Marianne Eigenheer, Untitled, from the series Bilder zur Lage, 1981/1982, watercolour on paper, 15 × 12.5 cm

Eigenheer’s work has its roots in drawing, in which the freely moving line precedes the flat, pictorial dimension. Her drawings are gesticulating, free line works on paper, in which the spontaneous, subconscious action is combined with conscious formal and content-related decision-making. In the 1980s, the important series Bilder zur Lage, of postcard-sized drawings, was created. They are semiabstract forms and “mergers of entirely different beings,” which attain comic-like, erotic associations, symbolic elements and also a great dynamic. At this time, she also painted large canvases, as part of the series Misere des Herzens (Misery of the Heart), with animal silhouettes, human figures and hybrid beings, who seem to float or lie before monochrome backgrounds. Eigenheer describes the creation of these pictures as follows:

At one point in my life, still in Lucerne, I had a very big studio and painted large pictures, and out of lines, out of this tangle of lines, which was there first, animals suddenly emerged, to my own surprise. But these animals, or rather animal forms, were not important to me as animals, but rather, they literally represented my physical state. And so, as animals always are: A reflection of one’s own condition.

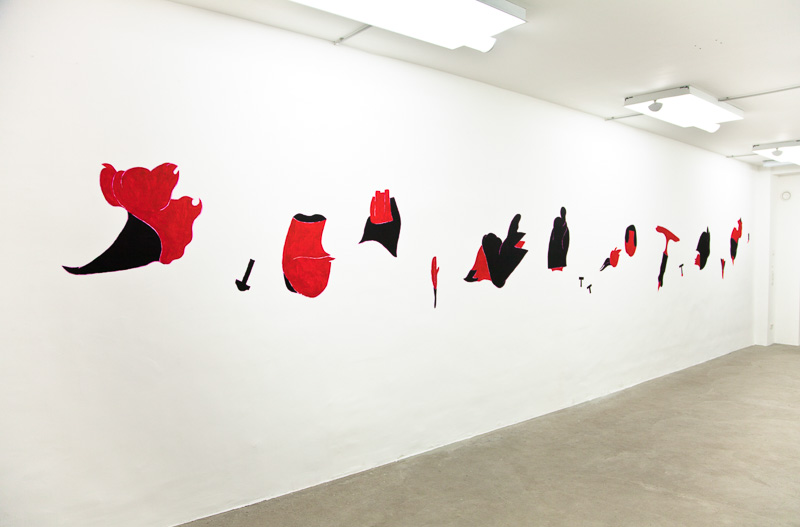
Marianne Eigenheer, exhibition view, Les Guédés dansent toujours, Das Esszimmer, Bonn, 2012

Later came works on canvas and wall drawings, characterized by the use of red, black and gold, consisting mostly of borders, features and amorphous, semi-abstract forms and form developments. These include the wall drawings Das Buch der 5 Ringe von Mushahi, 1991, at Kiel Central Station or Les Guédés dansent toujours (2012).

These are the effects of my music studies, the motion in space and time. I can make things visible that I would not be able to describe. In that, I feel related to Maria Lassnig, Louise Bourgeois or Nancy Spero. Maybe this is because I am in this world in a female body. I anchor myself to myself again through these drawings.

—

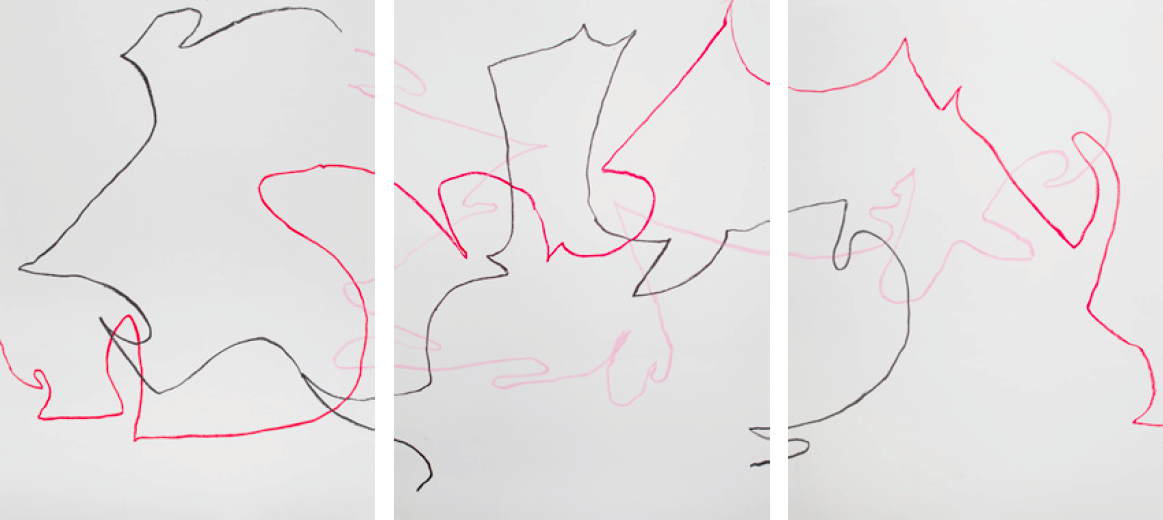
Marianne Eigenheer, Untitled (triptych), oil pastel on paper, 70 × 50 cm, 2015

== Group exhibitions ==
- 2012: Marianne Eigenheer, sic!–Raum für Kunst, Lucerne, 7 January 2011 – 11 February 2012.
- 2012: Das Esszimmer, Bonn
- 1977: Marianne Eigenheer, Kunstmuseum Luzern, 27 March – 1 May 1977.

== Publications ==
- Jean-Christophe Ammann: Marianne Eigenheer, Ausstellungskatalog, Kunstmuseum Luzern, 27 March – 1 May 1977.
- Marianne Eigenheer: Journal Galerie E+F Schneider, Le Landeron, No 26, 1981.
- Marianne Eigenheer. Kunstverein Schaffhausen, Museum zu Allerheiligen Schaffhausen, 12 January – 10 February 1985
- Armin Wildermuth: Images of Change (1984). Marianne Eigenheer's Recent Work. In: Marianne Eigenheer. Kunstverein Schaffhausen, Museum zu Allerheiligen Schaffhausen, 1985.
- Annemarie Monteil: Lebensspur und Farbwildwechsel. in: Künstler. Kritisches Lexikon der Gegenwartskunst. Weltkunst, Bruckmann, Munich 1990.
- Marianne Eigenheer, Stephan Berg, Kunstverein Freiburg e. V. (ed.): Marianne Eigenheer. Wandarbeiten 1991/92. Waldkircher Verlagsgesellschaft, Freiburg 1991.
- Galerie Marianne Grob, Berlin (ed.): Marianne Eigenheer. Berlin 1996.
- Marianne Eigenheer, Hans Ulrich Obrist: Gespräch Marianne Eigenheer und Hans Ulrich Obrist. In: sic! Raum für Kunst Luzern (Hrsg.): LACK. Fliegende Tiere, Körper und Sterne am Himmel. No 3, Maniac Press, Lucerne 2012.
- Yasimin Kunz, Suzi Teo: Marianne Eigenheer. In: Vado Via – excerpts from a drawing life. exhibition catalogue, ed. by Museum Quality, Brooklyn, 2015.
- Suzi Teo: Marianne Eigenheer. Bilder zur Lage. exhibition catalogue, ed. by Museum Quality, Brooklyn 2015.
