= Celia Hempton =

British artist

Celia Hempton (born Stroud, England) is a British artist based in London and has exhibited internationally across Europe, Asia and North and South America. Hempton is primarily a painter but works across different medias including sound and performance. Her primary artistic interest is feelings of discomfort and confronting those feelings.

In 2016, Hempton was included in Vitamin P3 as one of 'tomorrow's artists'.

== Education ==
Hempton studied Fine Art at Glasgow School of Art from 2000 to 2003 where she also played in a band called I Love Lucy. Hempton then moved to London and completed her MA in Painting at the Royal College of Art from 2005 to 2007.

== Work ==
Hempton is most famous for her series 'Chat Random' (2014–ongoing), which consists of images of male genitalia found through the website Chatrandom.com. She cycles through the different live images of people she finds online using her laptop then begins to paint often using bright artificial colours. The works were first exhibited in 2014 and titled with the subject's country and the date she encountered them. Hempton sees this series as subverting the male gaze and uses her position as a woman to confront the taboo of painting a penis. The piece was included in Omar Kholeif's exhibition 'Electronic Superhighway (2016-1966) at the Whitechapel Gallery.

Her paintings vary in size, sometimes mimicking a mobile or laptop screen, other times taking up a large scale.

In 2014 Hempton collaborated with her brother Sam Hempton to create a sound piece, which was made after a few days spent on the Volcano island of Stromboli.

== Awards ==
- Civitella Ranieri Foundation residency, Umbria, Italy, 2014
- Sainsbury Scholarship in Painting, The British School at Rome, Italy, 2008 -2010
- Neville Burston Memorial Award, Royal College of Art, London, UK, 2007
