= Centre for Recent Drawing =

Curatorial space in London, United Kingdom

Coordinates: 51°32′44.85″N 0°06′16.12″W

The Centre for Recent Drawing (C4RD) is a non-commercial curatorial space in London, for the exhibition of recent drawing and providing access and discussion for current drawing practice, and to foster the audience for drawing within the general public. It was founded by Andrew Hewish in 2004.

== Overview ==
The centre was established to provide a site in London for the display of drawings free from the commercial concerns that pervade the London art scene and to provide a context for drawing that could also exist beyond the demands of the fine arts. Its emphasis is on recent rather than the more commercially regulated 'contemporary'.

As a centre it aims to operate as a node of activity between the artist's studio, art college, school, therapeutic or architectural practice and the public, to provide experience in exhibition and curatorship, to add focus to a college programme and to share the experience of drawing.

== Activities ==
Since 2004 C4RD has provided a museum space for the exhibition of drawings by established and emerging international and UK artists, illustrators and designers, architects, art therapists, musicians and students in art from various art institutions in Britrain: Royal Academy, Loughborough University, Goldsmiths College, Camberwell College of Arts, London Metropolitan University, Wimbledon School of Art, Royal College of Art and the Prince's Drawing School. It is a non-profit volunteer-run, non-governmental organisation dependent on private donation.

== See also ==
- Campaign for Drawing
