= Goldsmiths CCA =

Contemporary art gallery in London, England

Coordinates: 51.4751°N 0.0377°W

Goldsmiths Centre for Contemporary Art, known as Goldsmiths CCA, is a contemporary art gallery in New Cross, London within the campus of Goldsmiths, University of London.

The gallery is located in the former boiler house and public laundry of Laurie Grove Baths, a Grade II-listed building. The building was refurbished by Assemble with a total area of 1,000m^{2}, including 7 galleries, at a cost of £4.6million. The gallery opened on 8 September 2018 with an exhibition by Mika Rottenberg.
