= Francisco Sierra (artist) =

Swiss painter (born 1977)

Francisco Sierra (born 1977, Chile) is a contemporary artist known for his use of irony and humour in his photorealistic drawings and paintings.

== Life and Work ==
Sierra was born in Chile in 1977 and moved with his family to Switzerland in 1986, where he gre up in Herisau and St. Gallen. Interested in both painting and music since childhood, he completed his violin studies first before he turned to painting, largely self-taught. He developed his own visual language, oscillating between technical precision, conceptual tension and humor. A main motif consists in everyday objects that are elevated through size or their rendering in the style of old-masters.

== Awards ==
He has received several Swiss grants and the Manor Art Prize, for which he was given a solo exhibition at the Kunstmuseum St. Gallen.

== Exhibitions ==
- Solo exhibition at Wilhelm-Hack-Museum
- Solo exhibition at Galerie Gregor Staiger
- Solo exhibition at Kunstmuseum Solothurn
- Solo exhibition at Kunsthalle Appenzell

== Monographs ==
- Francisco Sierra. With texts by Christoph Vögele, Raphael Gygax, Roland Wäspe and an interview by Nadine Wietlisbach, edited by Kunstmuseum St.Gallen and Kunstmuseum Solothurn. Verlag für Moderne Kunst Nürnberg, 2013 - ISBN 978-3-86984-057-4 at Google Books
- Cahier d’Artiste. Text by Giovanni Carmine, edited by Pro Helvetia Schweizer Kulturstiftung, Edizioni Periferia, 2009 - ISBN 978-3-907474-59-4
- A Parallel Universe. Text by Fanni Fetzer and Reinhard Spieler, edited by Kunsthaus Langenthal und Wilhelm-Hack-Museum, Ludwigshafen am Rhein, 2009 - ISBN 978-3-905817-18-8
