= Manor Cultural Prize =

Manor Cultural Prize (German: Manor Kunstpreis; French: Prix Manor) is a Swiss fine arts prize awarded every two years by the Manor (department store) alongside art museums in 12 Swiss cities, which was founded in 1982 in Lucerne. The goal is to promote emerging artists under the age of 40.

== About ==
Manor Cultural Prize was founded in 1982 by Philippe Nordmann. The award includes a cash prize (roughly 15,000 Swiss francs), the acquisition of art for their museum art collection, an exhibition and published exhibition catalogue.

Manor Cultural Prize participating cities
City and State	Museum	Since
Aarau, Canton of Aargau	Aargauer Kunsthaus	1989
Basel, Canton of Basel	Kunstmuseum Basel	1987
Biel, Canton of Bern	Kunsthaus Pasquart	2009
Chur, Canton of Graubünden	Bündner Kunstmuseum	1990
Geneva, Canton of Geneva	MAMCO	1987
Lausanne, Canton of Vaud	Musee de l'Elysee (Note: In Lausanne there is a rotation between the three museums, including École cantonale d'art de Lausanne, and Cantonal Museum of Fine Arts)	1989
Lugano, Canton of Ticino	Museo Cantonale d'Arte (2005–2014); MASI Lugano (2015–present)	2005
Lucerne, Canton of Lucerne	Kunstmuseum Luzern	1982
Schaffhouse, Canton of Schaffhausen	Museum zu Allerheiligen	1987
Sion, Canton of Valais	Cantonal Museum of Fine Arts	2007
St. Gallen, Canton of St. Gallen	Art Museum St. Gallen	1990
Winterthur, Canton of Zurich	Kunstmuseum Winterthur	1999

== Awardees ==
This is a select list of the Manor Cultural Prize awardees, organized by location and date. The first award was given in Lucerne in 1982.

=== Canton of Aargau ===
- 1989 Stefan Gritsch
- 1990 Silvia Bächli
- 1995 Beat Zoderer
- 1996 Renée Levi
- 2000 Dominique Lämmli
- 2002 Daniel Robert Hunziker
- 2004 Ingrid Wildi Merino
- 2007 Andreas Zybach
- 2009 Thomas Galler
- 2011 Marianne Engel
- 2013 Veronika Spierenburg
- 2016 Marta Riniker-Radich
- 2018 Cédric Eisenring

=== Canton of Basel ===
- 1987 Thomas Huber
- 1989 Hannah Villiger
- 1990 Christine Brodbeck
- 1992 Elisabeth Masé
- 1994 Claudia and Julia Müller
- 1996 Teresa Hubbard and Alexander Birchler
- 2001 Lori Hersberger
- 2002 Markus Müller
- 2004 Edit Oderbolz
- 2006 Boris Rebetez
- 2008 Emil Michael Klein
- 2010 Kilian Ruthemann
- 2013 Lena Maria Thüring
- 2016 Johannes Willi
- 2023 Gina Folly

=== Canton of Bern ===
- 2009 San Keller
- 2011 Julia Steiner
- 2014 Raphael Hefti
- 2016 Livia Di Giovanna
- 2018 Manuel Burgener

=== Canton of Geneva ===
- 1987 Philippe Deglise
- 1988 Carmen Perrin
- 1989 Gilles Porret
- 1990 Daniel Berset
- 1993 Marie José Burki
- 1997 Christian Robert-Tissot
- 1997 Francesca Gabbiani
- 2000 Elena Montesinos
- 2001 Pierre Vadi
- 2003 Hervé Graumann
- 2005 Donatella Bernardi
- 2007 Jérôme Leuba
- 2009 Marc Bauer
- 2011 Mai-Thu Perret
- 2014 Sonia Kacem
- 2016 Émilie Parendeau
- 2017 Timothée Calame
- 2023 Lou Masduraud

=== Canton of Graubünden ===
- 1990 Gaudenz Signorell
- 1992 Hans Danuser
- 1994 Thomas Zindel
- 1996 Markus Casanova
- 2002 Kurt Caviezel
- 2004 Zilla Leutenegger
- 2006 Gabriela Gerber and Lukas Bardill
- 2008 Monika Von Aarburg
- 2010 Bianca Brunner
- 2013 Mirko Baselgia
- 2017 Ester Vonplon
- 2023 Linda Semadeni

=== Canton of Lucerne ===
- 1982 Andreas Gehr
- 1983 Claude Sandoz
- 1984 Luciano Castelli
- 1985 Eva Stürmlin
- 1986 Alexander Fischer (sculptor)
- 1987 Herbert Kaufman
- 1988 Franz Wanner
- 1989 Rolf Winnewisser
- 1990 Christoph Rütimann
- 1992 Pia Fries
- 1994 Albrecht Schnider
- 1996 Remy Markowitsch
- 1998 Markus Döbeli
- 2001 Stefan Banz
- 2002 Nils Nova
- 2004 Tatjana Marusic
- 2007 Robert Esterman
- 2009 Giacomo Santiago Rogado
- 2011 Patricia Bucher
- 2014 Roland Roos
- 2016 Georg Keller
- 2018 Kyra Tabea Balderer

=== Canton of Schaffhausen ===
- 1987 Markus Haberli
- 1988 Carlo Domeniconi
- 1989 Thomas Grandy
- 1990 André Bless
- 1992 Daniele Bunzli
- 1994 Katharina Bürgin
- 1996 Markus Wetzel
- 1998 Yves Netzhammer
- 2001 Olaf Breuning
- 2002 Stefan Sulzberger
- 2004 Zeljka Marusic and Andreas Helbling
- 2023 Reto Müller

=== Canton of St. Gallen ===
- 1990 Peter Kamm
- 1991 Alex Hanimann
- 1994 Pipilotti Rist
- 2000 Christoph Büchel
- 2002 Andres Lutz and Anders Guggisberg
- 2004 Caro Niederer
- 2006 Yves Mettler
- 2008 Christian Vetter
- 2010 Alexandra Maurer
- 2013 Francisco Sierra
- 2017 Georg Gatsas
- 2023 Juliette Uzor

=== Canton of Ticino ===
- 2005 Andrea Crociani
- 2007 David Cascio
- 2009 Matteo Terzaghi and Marco Zürcher
- 2011 Pascal Schweighofer
- 2014 Samoa Rémy
- 2016 Marco Scorti
- 2018 Vera Trachsel

=== Canton of Valais ===
- 2007 Martina Gmür
- 2010 Joëlle Allet
- 2013 JocJonJosch
- 2015 Barbezat Villetard
- 2017 Eric Philippoz
- 2023 Aurélie Strumans

=== Canton of Vaud ===
- 1989 Laurent Hubert
- 1998 Alain Huck
- 1998 Laurence Pittet
- 1998 Bernard Voïta
- 1996 Ariane Epars
- 1998 Anne Peverelli
- 2001 Nicolas Savary
- 2002 Philippe Decrauzat
- 2004 Didier Rittener
- 2006 Catherine Leutenegger
- 2009 Aloïs Godinat
- 2011 Laurent Kropf
- 2014 Julian Charrière
- 2016 Annaïk Lou Pitteloud
- 2020 Anne Rochat
- 2022 Sarah Margetti

=== Canton of Zurich ===
- 1999 Britta Huttenlocher
- 2001 Mario Sala
- 2002 Nick Hess
- 2004 Karim Noureldin
- 2006 Andro Wekua
- 2008 David Chippo
- 2011 Fabian Marti
- 2013 Alexandra Navratil
- 2017 Christoph Eisenring
- 2023 Jan Vorisek
