= Ingrid Wildi Merino =

Chilean-born Swiss video artist (born 1963)

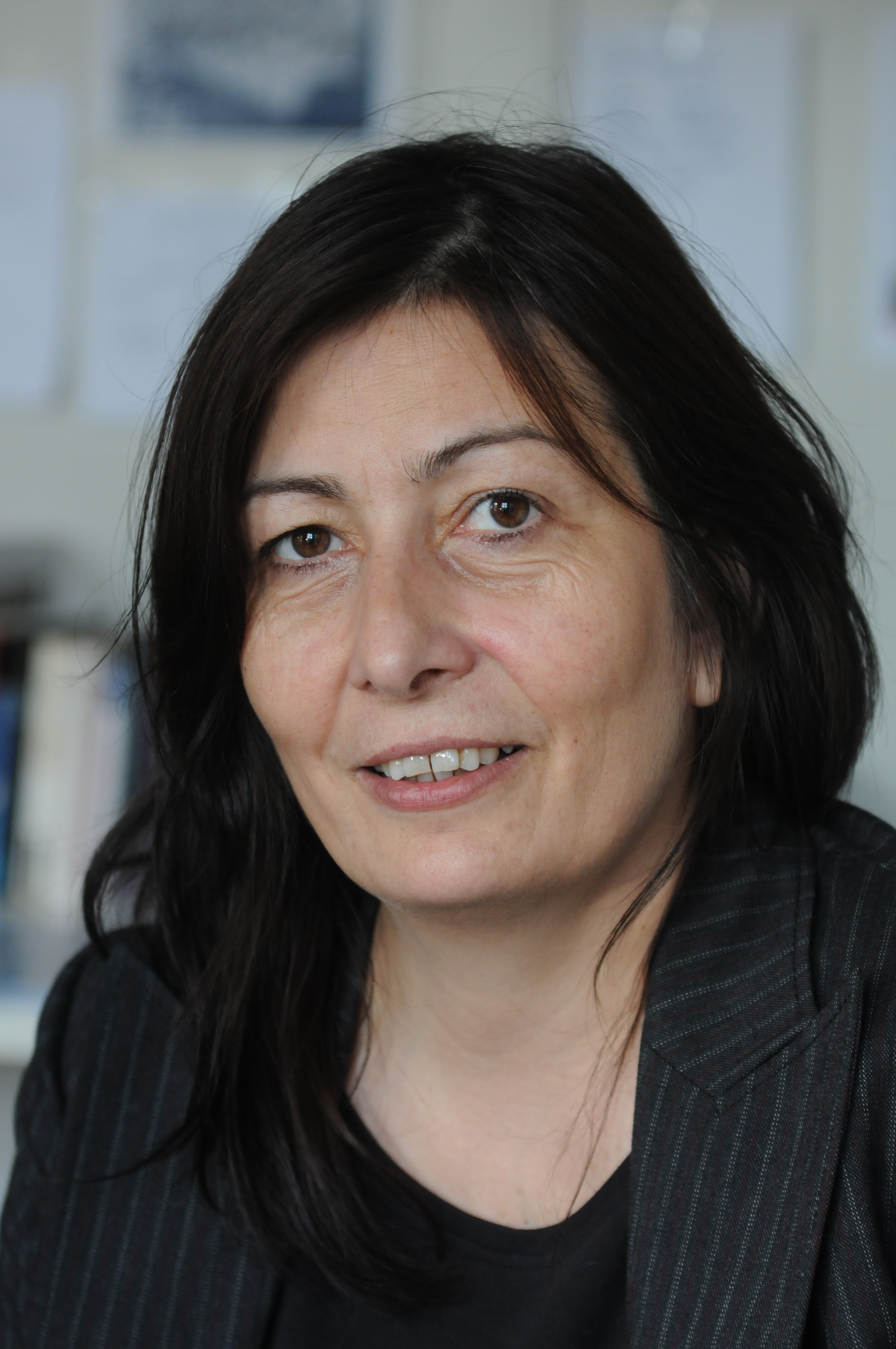
- Born: Ingrid Paula del Carmen Wildi-Merino; September 19, 1963 (age 63); Santiago, Chile
- Education: Zurich University of the Arts, Geneva University of Art and Design
- Occupations: Video artist, curator, educator
- Awards: Manor Cultural Prize (2004), Prix Méret-Oppenheim (2009)
- Website: Official website

Ingrid Paula del Carmen Wildi-Merino (born 1963) is a Chilean-born Swiss video artist, curator, and educator. She has been a lecturer at the Geneva University of Art and Design, from 2005 to 2016. She has been active in Geneva, Biel, and Madrid; and she currently lives in Santiago.

== Early life and education ==
Ingrid Wildi Merino was born in Santiago, Chile on September 19, 1963, as the daughter of a Swiss father and a Chilean mother. In 1981, she moved to Switzerland with her father, and they settled in Niederlenz in Canton Aargau.

From 1994 to 1997, Wildi Merino studied at Zurich University of the Arts, where she was a student of Bernd Höppner. She continued her studies between 1998 and 2000, and she completed a postgraduate diploma at the École Supérieure des Beaux-Arts, Genève (later known as the Geneva University of Art and Design), where she was a student of the artists Silvie Defraoui, Dominique Gonzalez-Foerster, and Ursula Biemann.

== Career ==
She previously taught at the University of Alcalá from 2010 to ?; and the Geneva University of Art and Design from 2005 to 2016.

Her artwork can be found in museum collections including the Aargauer Kunsthaus, Kunsthaus Zurich, and Fonds municipal d'art contemporain de la Ville de Genève (FMAC).

=== Exhibitions ===
Wildi Merino's first solo exhibition was in 2004 at the Aargauer Kunsthaus, and at the Centre d'Art Contemporain Genève. In 2005, Wildi Merino was included in the Swiss Artists Pavilion for the 51st Venice Biennale. In 2009, she was part of the 7th Mercosul Biennial, held in Porto Alegre, Brazil.

=== Awards ===
In 2004, Wildi Merino was awarded the Manor Cultural Prize for the Canton of Aargau. In 2009, she was awarded the Prix Méret-Oppenheim.

== See also ==
- Swiss Chileans
