= Prix Meret-Oppenheim =

The Grand Prix suisse d’art / Prix Meret-Oppenheim is an award given to Swiss artists. The prize has been awarded annually since 2001.

Each year, the Federal Office of Culture (OFC), based upon the recommendations of the Federal Art Commission (CFA), awards one or more prizes worth forty thousand Swiss francs (initially thirty-five thousand francs) to recognized Swiss artists, as well as architects and cultural mediators, over the age of forty. The prize is named after Meret Oppenheim (1913–1985), the Swiss visual artist and writer. The awards ceremony takes place in June, during the Art Basel fair.

In order to support young artists, architects and cultural mediators, the OFC has established the Federal Art Prize, as well as the Kiefer-Hablitzel Foundation scholarship.

== List of winners ==
- 2001 : Peter Kamm, Ilona Rüegg, George Steinmann
- 2002 : Ian Anüll, Hannes Brunner, Marie José Burki, RELAX (chiarenza & hauser & co), Renée Levi
- 2003 : Silvia Bächli, Rudolf Blättler, Hervé Graumann, Harm Lux, Claude Sandoz
- 2004 : Christine Binswanger & Harry Gugger, Roman Kurzmeyer, Peter Regli, Hannes Rickli
- 2005 : Miriam Cahn, Alexander Fickert & Katharina Knapkiewicz, Johannes Gachnang, Gianni Motti, Vaclav Pozarek, Michel Ritter
- 2006 : Markus Raetz, Robert Suermondt, Rolf Winnewisser, Dario Gamboni, Catherine Schelbert, Peter Zumthor
- 2007 : Véronique Bacchetta, Kurt W. Forster, Peter Roesch, Anselm Stalder
- 2008 : Mariann Grunder, Manon, Mario Pagliarani, Arthur Rüegg, edition fink (Georg Rutishauser)
- 2009 : Ursula Biemann, Roger Diener, Christian Marclay, Muda Mathis, Sus Zwick, Ingrid Wildi
- 2010 : Annette Schindler, Gion A. Caminada, Claudia et Julia Müller, Yan Duyvendak, Roman Signer
- 2011 : John M. Armleder, Patrick Devanthéry & Inès Lamunière, Silvia Gmür, Ingeborg Lüscher, Guido Nussbaum
- 2012 : Bice Curiger, Niele Toroni, Günther Vogt
- 2013 : Thomas Huber, Miller & Maranta, Marc-Olivier Wahler
- 2014 : Anton Bruhin, Catherine Queloz, Pipilotti Rist, pool Architekten
- 2015 : Christoph Büchel, Olivier Mosset, Staufer & Hasler, Urs Stahel
- 2016 : Adelina von Fürstenberg, Christian Philipp Müller, Martin Steinmann
- 2017 : Daniela Kaiser, Peter Märkli, Philip Ursprung
- 2018: Sylvie Fleury, Thomas Hirschhorn, Luigi Snozzi
- 2019: Marcel Meili & Markus Peter (architects), Samuel Schellenberg (journalist), Shirana Shahbazi (photographer)
- 2020 : Marc Bauer (artiste), Barbara Huser et Eric Honegger (architectes), Koyo Kouoh (curatrice)
- 2021 : Georges Descombes (architects), Esther Eppstein (artiste et curatrice), Vivian Suter
- 2022 : Caroline Bachmann (artist), Jürg Conzett & Gianfranco Bronzini (ingénieurs civils), Klodin Erb (artiste)
- 2023 : Stanislaus von Moos (historien d'art), Uriel Orlow (artiste), Parity Group (collectif au sein de l'EPFZ)
- 2024: Marianne Burkhalter & Christian Sumi, Jacqueline Burckhardt, Valérie Favre
- 2025: Felix Lehner, Pamela Rosenkranz, Miroslav Šik|
- 2026: Fabrice Gygi, Hilar Stadler, Tilla Theus
