= Leutenegger =

Leutenegger is a Germanic surname that may refer to:

- Brigitte Leutenegger, Swiss curler
- Catherine Leutenegger (born 1983), Swiss visual artist and photographer
- Gertrud Leutenegger (1948–2025), German-speaking Swiss poet, novelist, playwright and theatre director
- Hans Leutenegger (born 1940), Swiss bobsledder, 1972 Winter Olympic champion
- Susanne Leutenegger Oberholzer (born 1948), Swiss politician
