= Lamunière =

Lamunière is a French surname. Notable people with the surname include:

- Inès Lamunière (born 1954), Swiss architect and professor
- Simon Lamunière (born 1961), Swiss art curator
