= Stefi Talman =

Stefanie Thalman (Stefi Talman b. January 3, 1958) is a Swiss-born shoe designer.

== Early life ==
Stefi Talman was born in Zurich, Switzerland, and spent her childhood there. Her mother, Regula Nydegger is a rhythmic teacher from Switzerland. Her father Leung Kam Tim is a mathematician from Hong Kong. When Talman was about four years old, her mother married Swiss painter Roland Thalmann, from whom she received her last name.

In 1975, Talman studied for a year at the Zurich University of the Arts (HGKZ). Afterwards she entered a three-year apprenticeship as a shoemaker and finished her education with further training for cut-technique at the Ars Sutoria institute for shoe design in Milan.

== Career ==
In 1979 Talman opened her first atelier in Zürich, where she produced handmade shoes. The pieces, striking for their light weight and unusual colouring, were innovative at the time and led to a collaboration with a bigger distributor. In 1980 she introduced her first collection under the Stefi Talman label.

Among her four creations, which were available in a wide range of colours, was a shoe she named ZIP. A half-boot, with a zipper crossing the instep at an angle. This became a frequently imitated sensation and introduced the Stefi Talman label to an international clientele. The label ceased production in 1986 after seven collections and several changes of producers and manufacturers.

Talman started work as a freelancer for different European and Asian shoe companies, such as Charles Jourdan, Free Lance, Fiorucci and the Central Group in Bangkok.

Since 1994 Talman has worked closely with a manufacturer located near Venice, Italy. In 1999 she expanded the label with wallets, bags and accessories. In 2001 she opened a boutique in Zürich, Switzerland.

== Style ==
Talman produces the main part of her lasts herself. Her distinctive style shows through functional design features, clear lines, colorful accentuation and contrasts. Talman uses high quality materials, such as calf-fur and goat- and calfskin, with a preference for unusual prints and surfaces.

== Activities and exhibitions ==
- 1992 curatorship with Caro Niederer for the exhibition “Oriental Spirit in contemporary Zürich Flats“
- 1995 mentor of the degree program “Jewelry And Gadgetry” at the Zurich University of the Arts.
- 1997 Creatures Comfort, exhibition of fashion design and art, Zurich
- 1997–1998 teaching assignment at the School of Design of Pforzheim University in Germany
- 1998 Stefi Talman shoes were shown at the exhibition “Objet Du Désir” at the Zurich museum Bellerive
- 2002 Acquisition by the Bundesamt für Kultur of 16 Stefi Talman designs as a loan for the design collection of the Museum of Design Zurich
- 2007 joins the executive committee of Netzdk, the alumni organisation of the Zurich University of the Arts

== Sources ==
- Mattioli, Pietro. "1977 Book". Archived from the original on 2011-01-11.
- Grand, Lurker (June 2018). Hot Love - Swiss Punk and Wave.
- Leuschel, Klaus Swissness
