= Marc Bauer =

Swiss artist

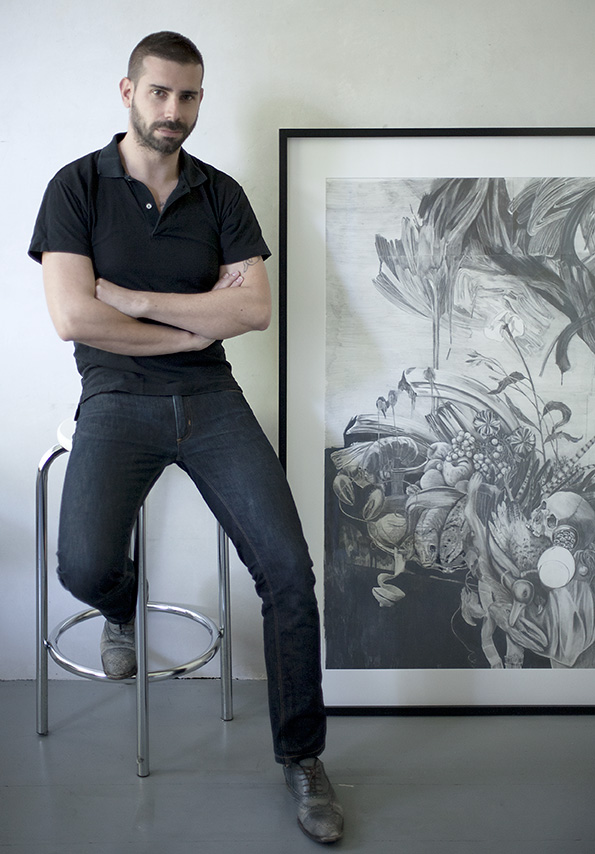
- Marc Bauer in his Berlin studio October 2012
- Born: May 28, 1975 (age 51); Geneva, Switzerland
- Education: 2002–2004 Rijksakademie van Beeldende Kunsten, Amsterdam 1995–1999 Ecole Supérieure d’Art Visuel, Geneva
- Known for: Drawing, Installation art, Animation

Marc Bauer (born May 28, 1975, Geneva, Switzerland) is an artist best known for his works in the graphic medium, primarily drawing.

== Life and career ==
Marc Bauer studied at the Ecole supérieure d’art visuel (now HEAD) in Geneva and the Rijksakademie van beeldende kunsten, in Amsterdam. He lives and works in Berlin and Zurich.

Bauer's works have been exhibited worldwide at institutions including group exhibitions at the Guggenheim Museum Bilbao (2021); Migros Museum, Zurich (2019); Kunsthaus Zurich (2019); S.M.A.K., Ghent (2015); Albertina Museum, Vienna (2015); Centre Pompidou (2011 and 2014). And solo exhibitions notably at the Menil Collection (2023-2024); Berlinische Galerie (2020-2021); Istituto Svizzero, Milan (2020); Drawing Room, London (2019); Museum Folkwang, Essen (2014); Centre Culturel Suisse, Paris (2013); Kunstmuseum St. Gallen (2011); MAMCO, Geneva (2010) and was included in 2018 Biennale of Sydney and the 2014 Liverpool Biennial.

In 2020 Bauer was the laureate of the Swiss Grand Award for Art / Prix Meret Oppenheim. and in the same year received the GASAG Art Prize.

Since 2015 Marc Bauer is permanent lecturer at Zurich University of the Arts (ZHdK).

== Work ==
=== Style and technique ===
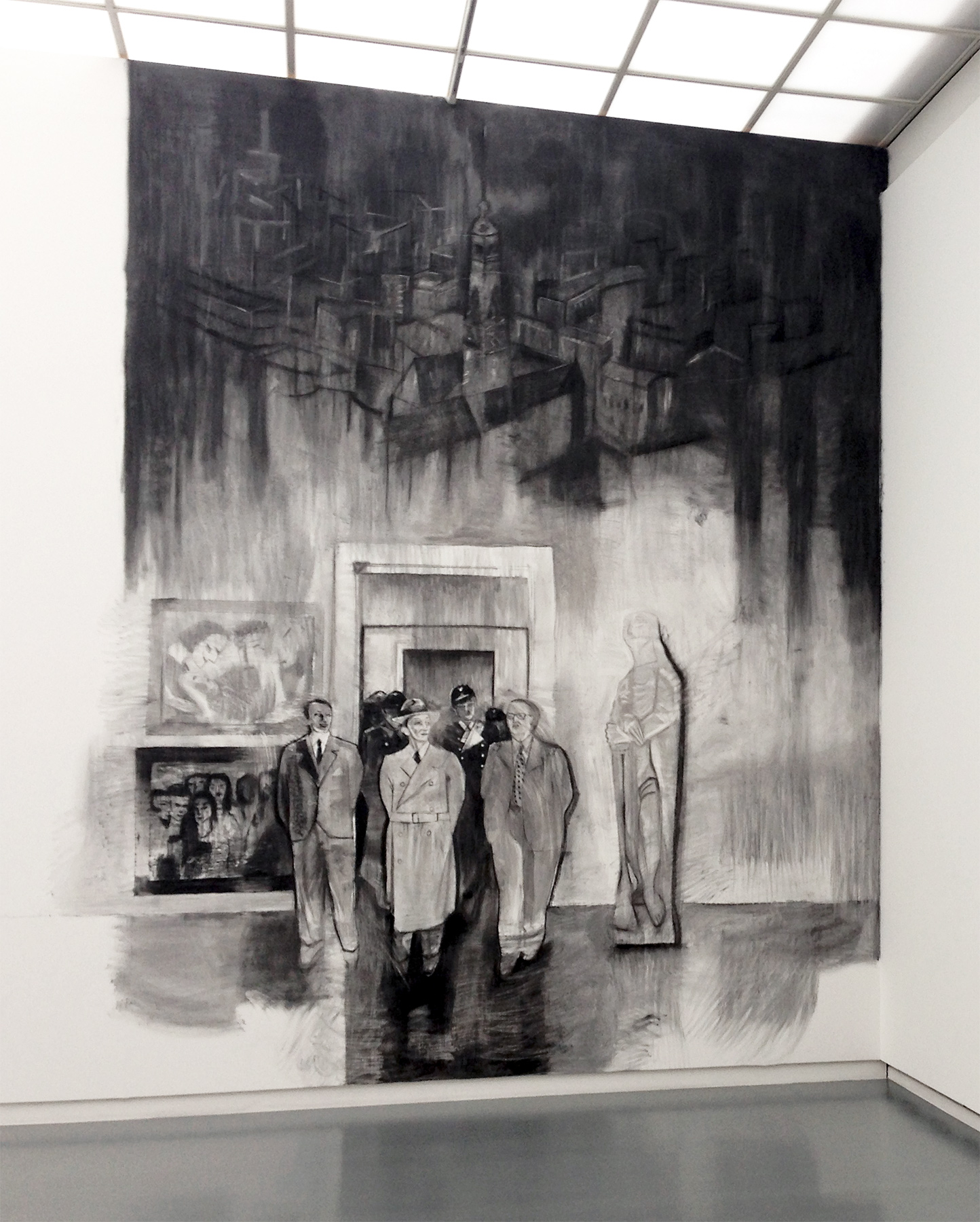
Marc Bauer's wall drawing that was part of the work Sphinx, 1931, 1935/46, 2014. charcoal on wall. First shown in the group exhibition Docking Station in the Aargauer Kunsthaus from August 2014 – November 2014

Bauer's graphic work is rendered almost exclusively in black-and-white, a pared-down aesthetic that seems deliberately evocative of old photographs. In scale, his graphic work varies widely, from small works on paper to large-scale images comprising several sheets pieced together, to digital prints made of blow-ups of his drawings, and even enormous wall drawings, rendered directly on the wall. Other supports for his work have included ceramic vases and coated Dibond aluminium panels. Bauer often produces works in series, and his exhibitions are usually conceived as site-specific installations that address the exhibition space as a larger composition. These installations frequently include a non-hierarchical arrangement of drawings – mostly unframed – pinned onto the walls, as well as drawings (often studies for the larger works) sometimes presented in specimen display cases to be viewed from above, textual accompaniments (sometimes even drawings of handwritten material such as letters), projections of earlier graphic works, objects (usually ones featured in a drawing), and large graphic murals made on the gallery's walls expressly for the show, which often add an illusionistic element to the overall display.

Notably, Bauer's installations also often feature drawings from earlier series, and this "recycling" leads to their ongoing re-contextualization and serves to underscore long-running themes that are then presented in a new, sometimes topical light. A good example of this is Bauer's continual (possibly even anachronistic) exploration of the theme of fascism, viewed most recently from the perspective of the Gurlitt case and the Nazi's "Degenerate Art" campaign.

Visually, Bauer's works are typically dark in tone and the contours of his figures are often blurred, through his practice of using a hard thin eraser to rub away and smear the graphite and lithographic chalk and to achieve a sense of depth. This blurring effect partly gives Bauer's drawings their distinctive "look" and also subverts the traditional concept of the line as the defining element in the art of drawing, as in some works – especially his landscapes or images of deserted cinemas and swimming pools – the dense application and distribution of the graphite has, at first glance, a paint-like, textured appearance. This effect culminates in the technique deployed in Bauer's animated film The Architect, in which the application of an oil paint on Plexiglas is captured in thousands of stop-motion images and even becomes a narrative element in itself which propels the story forward.

The blurring created through the repeated erasure and addition of more pencil simulates the process of remembering and forgetting that lies at the heart of Bauer's artistic endeavour, and which is encapsulated in his statement “in order to remember, you need to forget first”. The smudging of contour also echoes techniques traditionally associated with painting, such as sfumato and shows Bauer entering into a centuries-old discourse within the history of art about the possibilities of his chosen medium, contested here not necessarily against the art of painting, but against the supposed sharpness, objectivity, and dominance of the photographic image.

=== Subject matter ===
A key recurring theme in Bauer's art is history and memory – the personal and the collective – which he presents as closely intertwined. Some of his earliest works on paper drew from childhood memories and snapshots from family albums, featuring images of his own relations (as in the 2007 “A viso aperto” sequence from the artist's book History of Masculinity). These were interspersed with images of historical figures from the time, such as Mussolini and Hitler. Through this juxtaposition, the power relations in the family images were infused with broader power dynamics at play among the general populace under fascism.

Over the course of his oeuvre, Bauer's investigation of history and historiography has evolved from the primarily personal (as in “A viso aperto”) to broader social and political histories (e.g. Monument, Roman-Odessa and The will of desire) and increasingly involves him making archival research into his intended subjects beforehand. For instance, for the group show, Sacré 101 – An Exhibition Based on "The Rite of Spring", Bauer accessed the archives of the Ballets Russes to form his own personal impression of the dancer Vaslav Nijinsky and his suffering of schizophrenia. And in preparation for his show at the Aargauer Kunsthaus in 2014, Bauer's research into Hildebrand Gurlitt's involvement in the fate of two works by Karl Ballmer led him to access the archives at the Karl Ballmer Foundation. In both cases, Bauer's use of the archive, usually a touchstone for objectivity, resulted in a highly subjective perspective on his subject.

The subjective view on a historical topic is also achieved through Bauer's frequent invention of characters that provide a narrative structure for his series of drawings. These characters are often teenage boys or young men (as in In the Past, Only, Le Quartier, Quimper, and The Architect), whose actions convey a sense of latent violence and repressed (often homoerotic) desires. The narrative element in Bauer's work is further buoyed up by his repeated appropriation and reworking of well-known films, notably the iconic black-and-white images of silent cinema (Battleship Potemkin in Monument, Roman-Odessa, Nosferatu in The Architect), but also more recent, colour films such as Planet of the Apes, and La Jetée in Fragments of 29 Minutes, 1963. In his use of such sources, Bauer usually selects key images from the film and reworks them as graphically rendered stills. Shown in an elliptical sequence, these series adopt cinematic editing effects that require the spectator to piece together the narrative in their mind, while also tapping into the spectator's collective consciousness, in a process that “explores the way popular culture constructs its myths and symbols”.

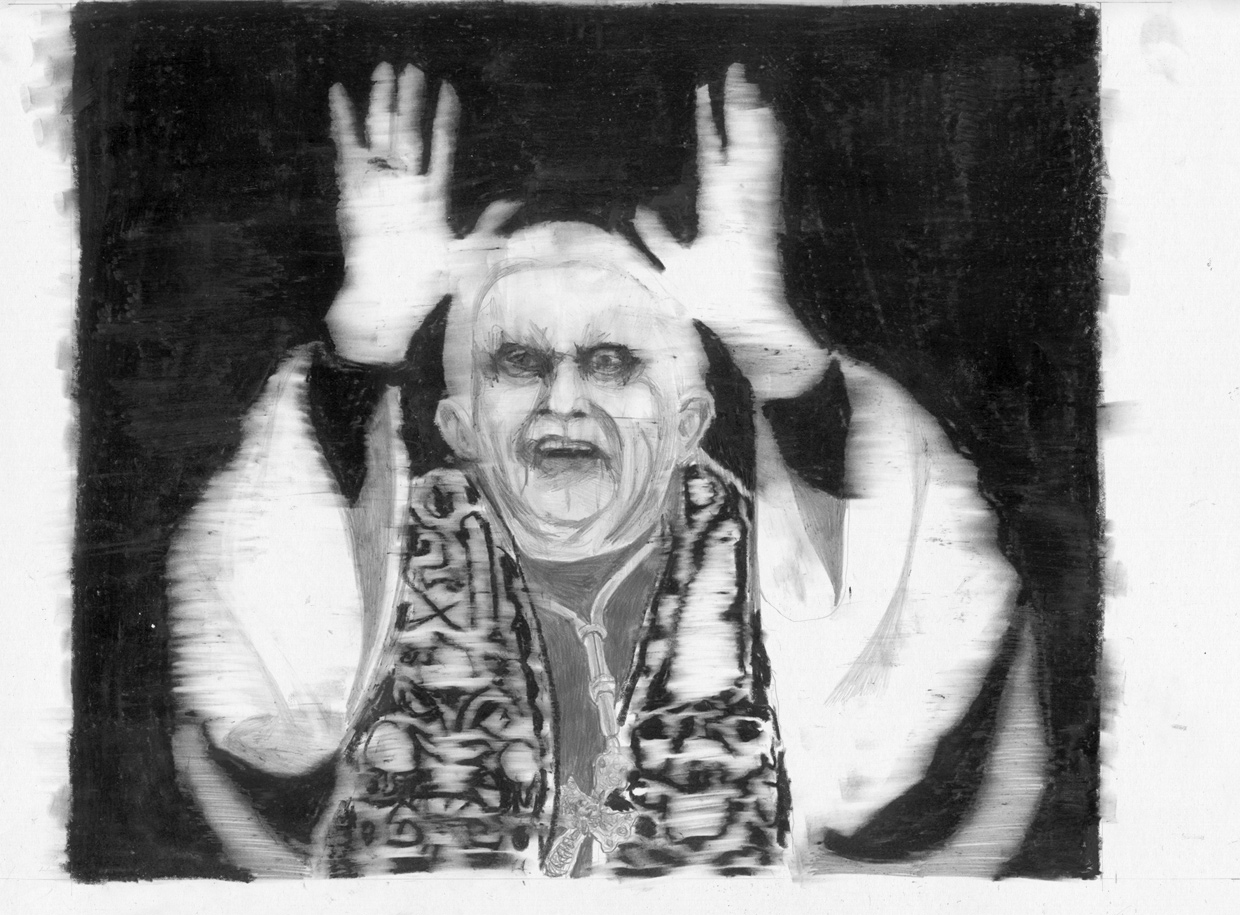
Pope, pencil on paper. 32 x 45 cm, 2007. Drawing by Marc Bauer.

A similar effect is achieved through Bauer's practice of culling images from historical photographs. These can range from intimate portrait shots (Martin Heidegger in the work Die Grosse Erwartung von M.H.), to school-photograph-like group portraits, and images of famous historical figures such as Pope Benedict XVI or Goebbels. These portrait drawings nearly always bring attention to the fact that they are derived from photographs and that the sitters are conscious of being portrayed. As such, Bauer can be said not only to reference specific photographs, but also the medium of photography itself as means of capturing moments in time. Accordingly, the atmosphere of Bauer's drawings often convey a characteristic sense of stillness (even when the figures are depicted in motion) and of the images’ “mediatedness”. This exploration of the concept of capturing time is reflected in his recurring interest and depiction of still lifes. By using the medium of drawing, in which each work is the result of a slow process formed by the continual interaction between the eye, mind, and hand, Bauer creates images that are in many ways more “still” than they appear in the photograph on which they are based or if they were shot by camera.

== Selected exhibitions ==
=== Solo ===
- 2026 Fear Rage Desire, Still Standing, Kunstmuseum Basel
- 2025 L’Avènement, Janvier 2025, Galerie Peter Kilchmann, Paris
- 2023-2024 Wall Drawing Series: Marc Bauer, Menil Drawing Institute, Houston
- 2022 The Default Brain, Galerie Peter Kilchmann, Zurich
- 2022 The Truce, Gilda Lavia Gallery, Rome
- 2021 L’Etat de la mer (Lame de fond, 2011-2020), FRAC Auvergne, Clermont-Ferrand
- 2020 The Blow-Up Regime, Berlinische Galerie, Berlin
- 2020 Mal Ȇtre / Performance, De La Warr Pavilion, Bexhill on Sea
- 2020 Mi piace Commenta Condividi, A Rhetorical Figure, Istituto Svizzero Milano
- 2019 Mal Ȇtre / Performance, Drawing Room, London
- 2018 Avondland, Deweer Gallery, Otegem
- 2017 An unser Schicksal von Heute und Morgen, Galerie Peter Kilchmann, Zurich
- 2016 Focus sur les collections Marc Bauer, Le Bal, Musée Jenisch, Vevey
- 2015 EMPEROR ME, Freymond-Guth Fine Arts Ltd., Zurich
- 2015 Cinerama, Frac Provence-Alpes-Côte d'Azur, Marseille
- 2015 Static / Unfolding Time, Deweer Gallery, Otegem
- 2014 Cinerama, Frac Alsace, Sélestat
- 2014 Der Sammler, Museum Folkwang, Essen
- 2014 In the past, only, Le Quartier, Quimper
- 2014 Cinerama, Frac Auvergne, Clermont-Ferrand
- 2013 The Astronaut, Freymond-Guth Fine Arts, Zurich
- 2013 Le Collectionneur, Centre Culturel Suisse, Paris
- 2012 Pleins Pouvoirs, septembre, La Station, Nice
- 2012 Le ravissement mais l'aube, déjà, Musée d'art de Pully, Lausanne. With Sara Masüger
- 2012 Nature as Territory, Kunsthaus Baselland, Muttenz/Basel
- 2011 Totstell-Reflexe, partly with Christine Abbt, Kunstmuseum St. Gallen, St. Gallen
- 2010 Premier conte sur le pouvoir, MAMCO, Geneva
- 2009 LAQUE, Frac Auvergne, Clermont-Ferrand
- 2007 History of Masculinity, attitudes, Geneva
- 2006 Geschichte der Männlichkeit III, o.T. Raum für aktuelle Kunst, Lucerne
- 2005 Overthrowing the King in His Own Mind, with Shahryar Nashat and Alexia Walther, Kunstmuseum Solothurn, Solothurn
- 2004 Tautology, Stedelijk Museum Bureau, Amsterdam
- 2004 Happier Healthier, Store Gallery, London
- 2001 Archeology, attitudes, Geneva
- 2000 Swiss Room, Art-Magazin, Zurich

=== Group ===
- 2025 What is the dream that makes you dream?, Kunsthalle Mainz
- 2025 Modell Neutralität, Argauer Kunsthaus, Aarau
- 2025 Nichts als die Welt, Museum zu Allerheiligen, Schaffhausen
- 2024 The house, the paste, the weather (Part 1), Cazul101 & BINZ39, Zurich
- 2024 Backstage Engelberg, Multiple locations in Engelberg
- 2024 Dialogues contemporains, FRAC - Alsace, Sélestat
- 2023 DISAPPEAR HERE, Museo Villa dei Cedri, Bellinzona
- 2022 Le Souffle des Ancêtres, Congo Biennale, Kinshasa
- 2022 The Curse of Smooth Operations, Impakt Festival, Utrecht
- 2022 30 Years Anniversary Exhibition, Galerie Peter Kilchmann, Zurich
- 2022 The Painting Show, Keteleer Gallery, Antwerp
- 2021 Los locos años veinte / The Roaring Twenties, Guggenheim Bilbao. Curated by Petra Joos and Cathérine Hug
- 2021 XXL Le dessin contemporain en grand, Musée Jenisch, Vevey
- 2021 Réserve du Patron, Kunstmuseum Solothurn
- 2020 Schall und Rauch, Kunsthaus Zurich. Curated by Cathérine Hug
- 2019 United by AIDS - An Exhibition about Loss, Remembrance, Activism and Art in Response to HIV/AIDS, Migros Museum, Zurich. Curated by Raphael Gygax
- 2019 Anatomy of Political Melancholy, The Athens Conservatory, Athens. Curated by Katerina Gregos
- 2018 21st Biennale of Sydney, Sydney Australia. Curated by Mami Kataoka
- 2018 Autofiktionen - Zeichnung der Gegenwart, Wilhelm Hack museum, Ludwigshafen
- 2017 10 Years Guerlain Drawing Prize, Centre Pompidou, Paris
- 2017 Ewige Gegenwart, Zeitgenössische Kunst Aus Der Graphischen Sammlung Eth Zürich, Helmhaus, Zurich
- 2017 Cinéma mon amour. Film in Art, Aargauer Kunsthaus, Aarau
- 2016 Museum Revisited 1996–2016, Migros Museum, Zurich
- 2016 Nous pourrions danser ensemble, Bâtiment d’Art Contemporain (BAC), Geneva
- 2016 Retour au meilleur des mondes, Frac Auvergne, Clermont-Ferrand
- 2016 Il y a de l’autre, Rencontres d’Arles. Curated by Agnès Geoffray and Julie Jones
- 2016 Donations - Florence & Daniel Guerlain, KUNSTEN Museum of Modern Art, Aalborg. Curated by Jonas Storsve
- 2016 A quoi tient la beauté des étreintes, Frac Auvergne, Clermont-Ferrand
- 2015 The Bottom Line, S.M.A.K, Ghent. Curated by Martin Germann and Philippe van Cauteren
- 2015 Triennial of Contemporary Prints, Musée des beaux-arts, Le Locle.
- 2015 Europa, Die Zukunft der Geschichte, Kunsthaus Zurich. Curated by Cathérine Hug
- 2015 Drawing Now, Albertina, Vienna. Curated by Elsy Lahner
- 2015 Meeting Point, Kunstverein Konstanz. Curated by Axel Lapp
- 2015 Drawing Biennial, Drawing Room, London
- 2015 Meisterzeichnungen, 100 Jahre Grafische Sammlung, Kunsthaus Zurich
- 2014 Docking Station, Aargauer Kunsthaus, Aarau
- 2014 Liverpool Biennial, curated by Mai Abu ElDahab and Anthony Huberman
- 2014 Sacré 101 – An Exhibition Based on "The Rite of Spring", Migros Museum für Gegenwartskunst, Zurich. Curated by Raphael Gygax
- 2013 Donation Florence et Daniel Guerlain, Centre Pompidou, Paris
- 2013 Les Pléiades - 30 ans des FRAC, Les Abattoirs, Toulouse
- 2012 Reality Manifestos, or Can Dialectics Break Bricks?, Kunsthalle Exnergasse, Vienna
- 2011 Le réel est inadmissible, d’ailleurs il n’existe pas, Centre d’Art du Hangar à Bananes, Nantes
- 2011 The Beirut Experience, Beirut Art Center, Beirut
- 2011 In erster Linie, Kunstmuseums Solothurn
- 2010 Voici un dessin Suisse (1990-2010), Musée Rath, Geneva
- 2009 Usages du document, Centre Culturel Suisse, Paris
- 2008 Shifting identities, Kunsthaus, Zurich
- 2004 Fürchte Dich, Helmhaus, Zürich
- 2004 A Molecular History of Everything, Australian Centre for Contemporary Art, Melbourne
- 2003 Durchzug/Draft, Kunsthalle, Zürich

== Projects ==
- 2019 White Violence: an Index of Torture, wall drawing at Chapelle Sainte Tréphine Pontivy, France
- 2015 City hospital Triemli, Zurich. Wall drawings
- 2015 Wall drawing in Kaufleuten Zurich
- 2013 Aubusson tapestry in cooperation with Aubusson Tapestry Museum, Melancholia I. Musée de la tapisserie d’Aubusson
- 2013 La Révolte et L'Ennui, curated exhibition with interventions by Marc Bauer. FRAC Auvergne, Clermont-Ferrand
- 2013 The Architect, Animated film, 27 minutes. Cooperation between Marc Bauer who animated the film and wrote the script, and the French music group Kafka who composed and performed the music.

== Publications ==
- White Violence, on domination, displacement and populism. Artist book. Published by FRAC Auvergne
- The Blow-Up Regime, GASAG Kunstpreis 2020. Catalogue/artist book. Published by Berlinische Galerie
- United by AIDS - An Anthology on Art in Response to HIV / AIDS, catalogue. ISBN 978-3-85881-839-3
- Now-Tomorrow-Flux - An Anthology on the Museum of Contemporary Art. JPR Ringier, ISBN 978-3-03764-367-9
- The Bottom Line, catalogue. Published by S.M.A.K. Ghent, ISBN 978-0-30022-009-4
- Drawing Now, catalogue. Published by Albertina, Vienna, ISBN 978-3-77742-434-7
- Europa, die Zukunft der Geschichte, catalogue, Published by Kunsthaus Zurich. ISBN 978-3-03810-088-1
- Meisterzeichnungen, 100 Jahre Grafische Sammlung, catalogue. Published by Kunsthaus Zurich. ISBN 978-3-85881-450-0
- The Architect, artists' book. Published by Frac Auvergne, Alsace and Paca, 2014. ISBN 978-2-907672-17-7
- The Collector, artists' book. Published by Centre Culturel Suisse, Paris, 2013. ISBN 978-2-909230-13-9
- Sacré 101 - An Exhibition Based on the Rite of Spring, catalogue. Published by Migros Museum, 2013. ISBN 978-3-03764-368-6
- VITAMIN D2 - New perspectives in drawing, catalogue. Published by Phaidon, London - New York, 2013. ISBN 978-0-7148-6528-7
- Donation Florence et Daniel Guerlain - Dessins contemporains, catalogue. Published by Centre Pompidou, Paris, 2013. ISBN 978-2-84426-625-5
- The Beirut Experience, catalogue. Published by attitudes, Genf. ISBN 978-29-40178-19-3
- MARC BAUER, monographic catalogue. Published by Kehrer, Heidelberg; and Kunstmuseum St.Gallen, 2011. ISBN 978-3-868281-60-6
- STEEL, artist book. Published by FRAC Auvergne, 2009. ISBN 978-2-907672-07-8
- History of masculinity, artist book. Published by attitudes, Geneva, 2007. ISBN 978-2-940178-11-7
- Documents, Marc Bauer: Tautology, writings. Published by Rijksakademie van Beeldende Kunsten, Amsterdam, 2005
- Overthrowing the king in his own mind, catalogue. Published by Kunstmuseum Solothurn and Revolver Editions, 2005. ISBN 978-3-865880-59-8
- Happier Healthier, artist book in cooperation with Vincent van der Marck and Store Gallery, London, 2004
- Across the Great Channel, artist book. Published by Memory Cage editions, Zürich, 2000. ISBN 3-907053-14-1

== Prizes ==
- 2020 Prix Meret Oppenheim 2020
- 2020 GASAG Kunstpreis 2020, Berlin
- 2011 Prize of the Cité Internationale de la Tapisserie et de l‘Art Tissé, Aubusson
- 2009 Prix Manor, Geneva
- 2006 Swiss Art Awards, Basel
- 2006 Artist residency in Beijing of the GegenwART Foundation, Berne
- 2005 Swiss Art Awards, Basel
- 2005 Swiss Institute residency, Rome
- 2001 Swiss Art Awards, Basel
- 1999 Prix Théodore Strawinsky, Geneva

== Public collections ==
- Aargauer Kunsthaus
- Museum Folkwang, Essen
- Centre Pompidou - Musée National d´Art Moderne, Paris
- Musée d'art de Pully, Lausanne
- Migros museum für gegenwartskunst, Zurich
- Kunstmuseum St. Gallen, St. Gallen
- Kunstmuseum Solothurn, Solothurn
- Kunsthaus, Zurich
- Sturzenegger Stiftung, Museum zu Allerheiligen, Schaffhausen
- FRAC Auvergne, Clermont-Ferrand
- FRAC Alsace, Sélestat
- Museo Cantonale d'Arte, Lugano
