= Pia Fries =

Swiss painter (born 1955)

- Born: October 6, 1955 (age 71); Beromünster, Switzerland
- Occupation: Painter

Pia Fries (born 6 October 1955) is a Swiss painter.

== Biography ==
Fries was born in Beromünster, Switzerland and studied sculpture in Lucerne in 1980, and painting under Gerhard Richter at the Kunstakademie Düsseldorf in 1986. She lives and works in Düsseldorf and Munich.

== Museum collections ==
- Aargauer Kunsthaus, Aarau, Switzerland.
- Binding Stiftung, Basel, Switzerland.
- Kunstmuseum Luzern, Switzerland.
- Kunstmuseum Winterthur, Switzerland.
- Neues Museum, Nuremberg, Germany.
- Niedersächsische Kulturstiftung, Hannover, Germany.
- Sprengel Museum, Hannover, Germany.
- Staatsgalerie Stuttgart, Germany.
- Museum of Fine Arts, Houston (MFAH), Houston, Texas

== Selected exhibitions ==
- 1992 Pia Fries, Kunstmuseum Luzern, Luzern; Bonner Kunstverein, Bonn
- 1997 Pia Fries, Kunstverein Freiburg i.Br.; Aargauer Kunsthaus, Aarau; Museum Kurhaus Kleve, Kleve
- 1999 La Biennale di Venezia: 48. esposizione internazionale d’arte: dapertutto
- 1999 Pia Fries: parsen und module, Kunstverein Göppingen, (Kat.)
- 2000 Pia Fries: en détail & en gros, Overbeck-Gesellschaft, Lübeck
- 2001 Beau Monde: Toward a Redeemed Cosmopolitanism, The Fourth International Biennial, SITE Santa Fe
- 2005 Extreme Abstraction, Albright-Knox Art Gallery, Buffalo, NY
- 2007 Pia Fries: Malerei 1990-2007, Kunstmuseum Winterthur; Josef Albers Museum Quadrat, Bottrop
- 2008 Pia Fries: la partie élévatrice, Galeria Filomena Soares, Lisbon
- 2009 Pia Fries: merian’s surinam, Galerie Nelson-Freeman, Paris
- 2010 Pia Fries: zirkumpolar, Galería Distrito Cu4tro, Madrid
- 2010 Pia Fries, Kunstmuseum Bonn
- 2010 Pia Fries: ambigu, Kunstmuseum St. Gallen
- 2011 Pia Fries: krapprhizom luisenkupfer, Staatliche Kunsthalle Karlsruhe
- 2011 Pia Fries: Ausstellung der Kunstpreisträgerin, Villa Wessel, Iserlohn
- 2012 Pia Fries: randmeer, CRG Gallery, NY
- 2013 Pia Fries: wetter fahnen fächer, Galerie Nelson-Freeman, Paris
- 2014 Pia Fries, paysages maritimes, Christopher Grimes Gallery L.A.
- 2015 Pia Fries: windhand laufbein, Akku-Emmen, Emmenbrücke, Lucerne
- 2015 Pia Fries: fernleib manual, MAI 36 Galerie, Zurich
- 2015 Pia Fries: tabula coloribus, Kunstparterre, Munich
- 2015 Pia Fries: volume & light
- 2016 Ortswechsel, Werke aus dem Kunstmuseum Bonn, Schauwerk Sindelfingen
- 2016 Pia Fries: oxyponto, Galerie Thomas, Munich
- 2016 Drama Queens - Die inszenierte Ausstellung, Museum Morsbroich, Leverkusen
- 2016 Tiefe nach Außen, Galerie der Künstler, Munich
- 2016 Die Erfindung der Abstraktion, Akademie Galerie, Düsseldorf
- 2016 Pia Fries: Weisswirt & Maserzug, Kopfermann-Fuhrmann-Stiftung, Düsseldorf,
- 2016 Pia Fries: seascapes, Christopher Grimes Gallery, Los Angeles
- 2017 THINK-PAINT, Unix-Gallery, New York
- 2017 Künstlerporträts Düsseldorf 1800 bis heute, Akademie Galerie, Düsseldorf
- 2017 20. Kunstausstellung Trubschachen 2017, Trubschachen, Schweiz
- 2017 Pia Fries: nasen und nauen, Galerie Ute Parduhn, Düsseldorf
- 2017 Pia Fries, Moss Art Center, Virginia, U.S.A.
- 2017 Hendrick Goltzius + Pia Fries: proteus und polymorphia, Museum Kurhaus Kleve
- 2017 Pia Fries: Vier Winde, Gerhard-Altenbourg Preis, Lindenau-Museum Altenburg
- 2018 Pia Fries: parsen und module, Musée d’art moderne de la Ville de Paris, 9.3.-20.5.2018
