= Britta Huttenlocher =

Swiss painter

Britta Huttenlocher (born 1962) is a Swiss painter.

== Awards ==
- 1999 Winner of the Manor Cultural Prize (German: Manor Kunstpreis).
