= Olaf Breuning =

Swiss-born artist

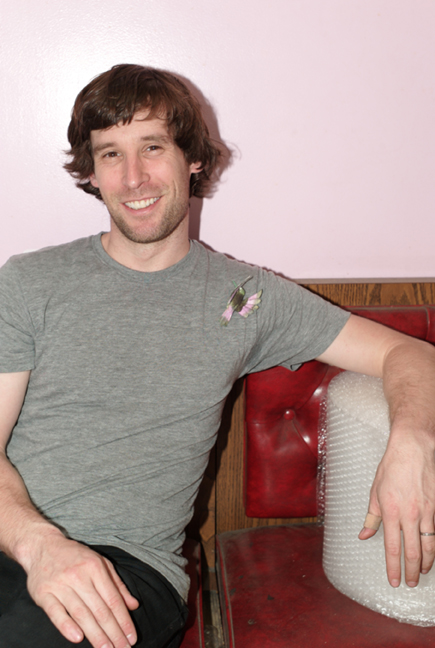
- Born: February 16, 1970 (age 56); Schaffhausen, Switzerland
- Education: Weiterbildungsklasse Fotographie, Höhere Schule für Gestaltung
- Known for: Artist, Sculpture, Drawing, Photography, Video
- Website: www.olafbreuning.com

Olaf Breuning (born February 16, 1970) is a Swiss-born artist, born in Schaffhausen, who lives in New York City.

== Works ==
- Home 1/Home 2 (2004/7) 30 minute video starring Brian Kerstetter. Home 1 is presented as a double-projection, where the main character can no longer distinguish the difference between reality and fiction. He wanders around a hotel room telling stories about himself and other people to the camera. As he tells the stories, they are simultaneously seen on the opposite screen. In Home 2 Brian Kerstetter plays an ignorant tourist staggering around the world from Switzerland to Africa and Japan to Papua New Guinea, crashing his western mentality upon the exotic places he goes.
- Ugly Yelp (2000), Apes (2001), King (2001), Hello Darkness (2002) With these installations, Breuning creates theatrical atmospheres using sound, video and light. These installations have been shown in many museums and are owned by collections internationally.
- Easter Bunnies (2004) A photograph created on Easter Island, transforming Moai into Easter bunnies by setting up rabbit ears on C-stands in the extreme foreground.
- Sibylle (1998)-- Photograph of a female model lying on a table, whose body has been affected by cultural references to Matthew Barney, Cindy Sherman, Pablo Picasso, and others, resulting a creepily mutilated creature.
- Smoke Bombs (2008) Exemplifies Breuning's photographic technique of leaving the mess of production within frame, allowing the viewer to see behind the scenes of the production.

== Exhibitions ==
=== Group exhibitions (selected) ===
In recent years he has exhibited his works at many group shows around the world, including The Somerset House, London; Herzliya Museum of Contemporary Art, Israel; Tinguely Museum, Basel; Nelson–Atkins Museum of Art, Kansas City; Museum der Moderne, Salzburg; Musée Rath, Geneva and many other venues. Some of them are listed below:

2014

- Das Fremde ist nur in der Fremde fremd, Museum Rietberg, Zurich, CH

2013

- Ursula Palla und Olaf Breuning. Hin und Her, Binz 39, Zurich, CH
- Métamatic Reloaded, Tinguely Museum, Basel, CH
- La realtà non è un luogo comune. Fotografie e video della Collezione d'arte della Julius Baer, Museo Cantonale d'Arte, Lugano, CH

2012

- Holzwege. Sentieri erranti. Arte svizzera dalla collezione della Mobiliare, Museo Cantonale d'Arte, Lugano, CH
- Parallelwelt Zirkus, Kunsthalle Wien, Vienna, AU
- Through the Looking Brain, Kunstmuseum St. Gallen, St. Gallen, CH
- Incongru. Quand l'art fait rire, Musée Cantonal des Beaux-Arts, Lausanne, CH

2011

- Through the Looking Brain, Kunstmuseum Bonn, Bonn, DE

2010

- Press Art. Die Sammlung Annette und Peter Nobel, Kunstmuseum St. Gallen, St. Gallen, CH

2009

- Darkside II. Fotografische Macht und fotografierte Gewalt, Krankheit und Tod, Fotomuseum Winterthur, Winterthur, CH
- 200 Artworks. 25 Years Artists, 21st Century Museum of Contemporary Art, Kanazawa, JP (catalogue ISBN 390758225X)

2008

- When fears become form, Centre d'art Neuchâtel (CAN), Neuchâtel, CH
- Sammlung/Collection Migros Museum für Gegenwartkunst Zürich 1978-2008, Migros Museum für Gegenwartskunst, Zurich, CH
- Whitney Biennial 2008, Whitney Museum of American Art, New York, US

2007

- 12e Biennale de l'Image en mouvement, Centre pour l'image contemporaine (CIC), Geneva, CH
- What we bought, Camera Austria, Graz, AU
- All about Laughter: humor in contemporary art, Mori Art Museum, Tokyo, JP
- Six Feet Under. Autopsie unseres Umgangs mit Toten. Autopsy of Our Relation to the Dead, Kunstmuseum Bern, CH

2006

- Imagination becomes reality. Part IV. Borrowed images, Sammlung Goetz, München, DE
- Cindy Sherman, Gianni Motti, Olaf Breuning, Galerie Nicola von Senger, Zurich, CH
- Some tribes, Christophe Guye Galerie, Zurich, CH

2003

- Urban Diaries. Young Swiss Art, Alcalá 31, Madrid, ESP
- M_ARS. Kunst und Krieg, de:Neue Galerie Graz am Landesmuseum Joanneum, Graz, AU

2002

- Lorbeer-Extrakt. Manor-Kunstpreis Schaffhausen 1987-2001, Museum zu Allerheiligen, Schaffhausen, CH (catalogue ISBN 3907066448)

2001

- M family. Die Bilder zum Migros Geschäftsbericht 2000, Migros Museum für Gegenwartkunst, Zurich, CH (catalogue ISBN 3952224901)
- Up in the sky. Himmel in der Kunst der 90er Jahre, Kunsthaus Grenchen, Grenchen, CH
- Collaborations with Parkett: 1984 to Now, Museum of Modern Art, New York, US

2000

- Eidgenössische Preise für freie Kunst 2000, Kunsthalle Fri Art, Freiburg, CH
- Let's be friends, Migros Museum für Gegenwartkunst, Zurich, CH
- EX25 Hochschule und Museum Für Gestaltung und Kunst Zürich die Letzten 25 Jahre Halle, Museum für Gestaltung Zürich, Zurich, CH
- Reality Bytes. Der medial vermittelte Blick, Kunsthalle Nürnberg, Nürnberg, DE

1999

- Eidgenössische Preise für freie Kunst 1999, Kunsthalle Zürich, Zurich, CH

1998

- Freie Sicht aufs Mittelmeer. Junge Schweizer Kunst, Kunsthaus Zürich, Zurich, CH (catalogue ISBN 3906574024)

== Books ==
- Ugly, 2000, monograph, Hatje Cantz, ISBN 3-7757-1105-8
- Home, 2004, monograph, JPR/Ringier, Magasin, Les Musees de Strasbourg, ISBN 2-940271-39-9
- Queen Mary, 2006, drawing catalogue, JPR/Ringier, ISBN 3-905701-94-4
- Queen Mary II, 2010, monograph, JPR/Ringier, Zurich
