= Silvie Defraoui =

Swiss artist

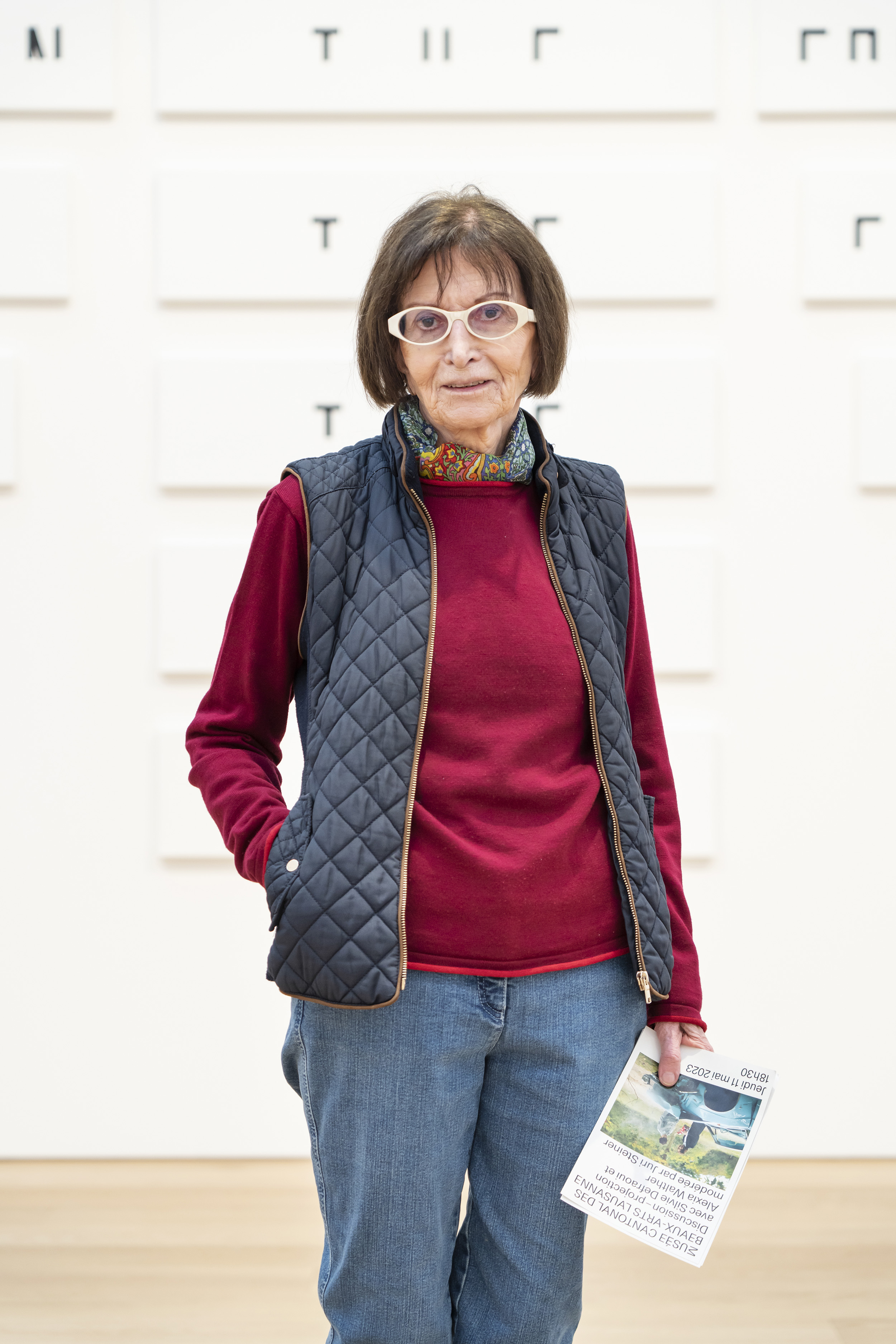
Image of Silvie Defraoui

Silvie Defraoui (née Rehsteiner; born 1935) is a Swiss visual artist who uses various forms of artistic expression: installation, photography, painting, screen printing, and video art. She lives and works in Vufflens-le-Château.

== Biography ==
Silvie Defraoui was born in St. Gallen and spent her childhood there and in Grisons. She first studied painting at the l'école des Beaux-Arts d'Alger and later ceramics at the l'école des Arts décoratifs de Genève. Between 1975 and 1994 she worked together with Chérif Defraoui (Geneva 1932–1994). From 1974 to 1999 she taught at the l'Ecole supérieure d'art visuel de Genève (today the Geneva School of Art and Design), where in 1975 she established together with Chérif Defraoui, the Mixed Media Studio.

== Exhibitions ==
=== Solo exhibitions ===
- 1979, Cartographie des contrées à venir, Soares dos Reis National Museum, Porto
- 1989, Orient/Occident, Centre d'Art Contemporain Genève / Musée Rath, Geneva.
- 1993, Les origines de la description, Le Magasin - Centre National d'Art Contemporain, Grenoble.
- 1996, Bruits de surface, Mamco, Musée d'art moderne et contemporain, Geneva
- 2000, Nacht und Tag und Nacht, Helmhaus, Zurich
- 2004–2005, Archives du futur, Kunstmuseum St. Gallen; Mamco, Musée d'art moderne et contemporain, Geneva
- 2009, Sombras electricas, Centre Culturel Suisse, Paris

=== Group exhibitions ===
- 1976, Venice Biennial
- 1979, Photography as art, art as photography II und III, Gesamthochschule Kassel
- 1981, Ils se disent peintres, ils se disent photographes, Musée d'Art Moderne, Paris
- 1992, La Fontaine du désir, documenta IX, Kassel
- 1997, Magie der Zahl, Staatsgalerie Stuttgart
- 1998, Freie Sicht aufs Mittelmeer, Kunsthaus, Zurich

== Awards ==
- 2006, Kulturpreis of the City of St. Gallen

== Publications ==
- Kihm, Christophe; Vögele, Christoph (2014). Silvie Defraoui. Und überdies Projektionen (Archives du futur). Zürich: Edition Fink. p. 96. ISBN 9783037461815.
- Bitterli, Konrad, editor (2004). Defraoui : archives du futur 1975 - 2004. Nürnberg: Verlag für Moderne Kunst. p. 248. ISBN 9783936711325.
