= Thomas Huber (artist) =

Swiss artist (born 1955)

Thomas Huber (born 14 July 1955, in Zurich) is a Swiss artist who lived and worked in Mettmann near Düsseldorf for several years and is currently resident in Berlin.

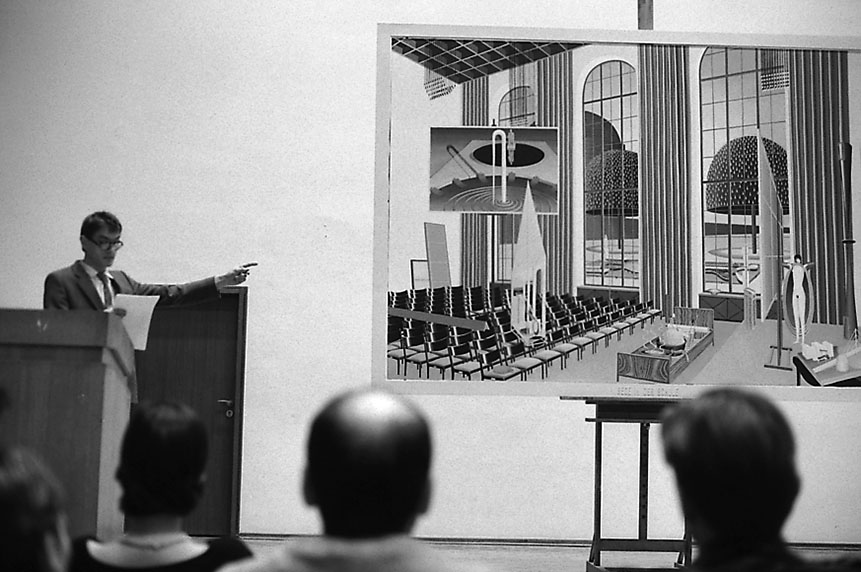
artist lecture "Rede in der Schule", Kunstakademie Düsseldorf 1984

== Biography ==
From 1977 to 1978, Huber studied at the Kunstgewerbeschule Basel with Franz Fedier, in 1979 at the Royal College of Art, London, and from 1980 to 1983 at the Kunstakademie Düsseldorf (as a master student of Fritz Schwegler). From 1992 to 1999, he was a professor at the Hochschule für Bildende Künste Braunschweig and in 1992, interim director of the Centraal Museum, Utrecht. Together with Bogomir Ecker, he initiated and realised the "Künstlermuseum" in 2001, the reconfiguration of the Museum Kunstpalast's collection in Düsseldorf. Between 2000 and 2002, Huber was chairman of the Deutscher Künstlerbund (German Artists Association). He has received numerous awards, including the Meret Oppenheim Prize in 2013, the Zurich Arts Society Prize, and the Preis für Junge Schweizer Kunst der Zürcher Kunstgesellschaft (in 1993).

== Work ==
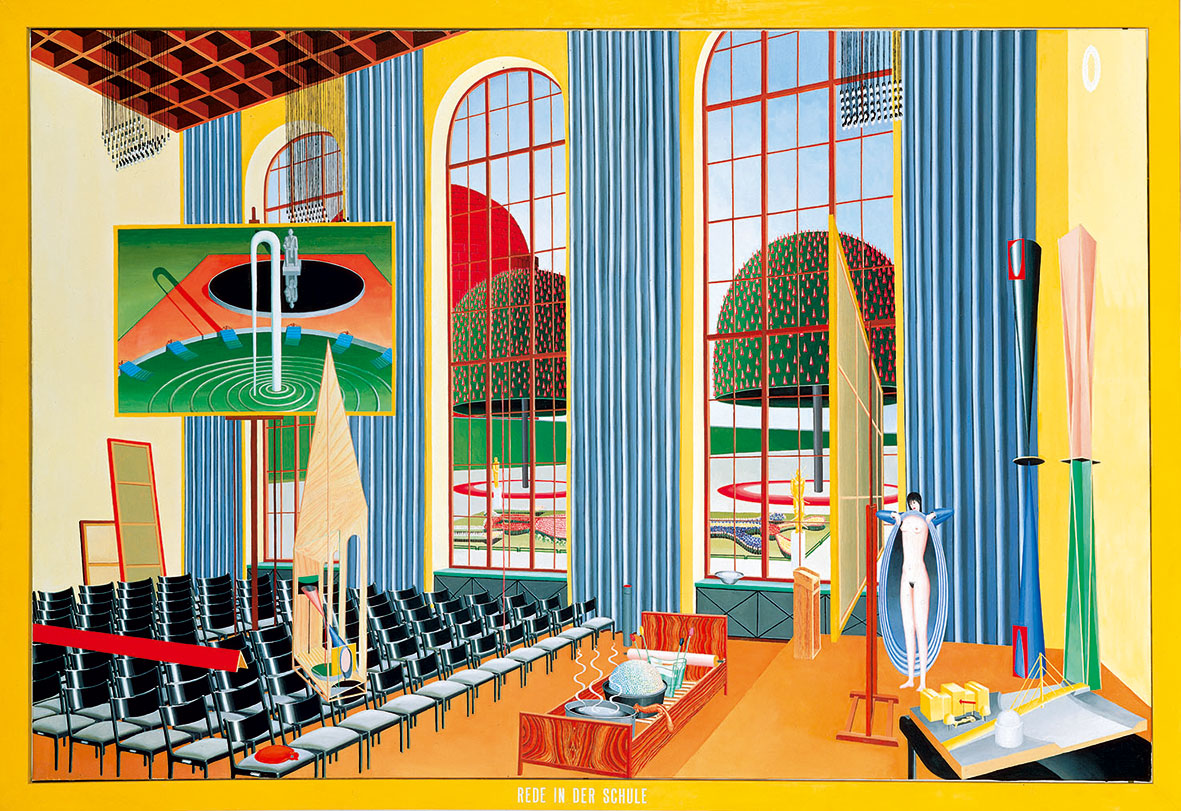
Rede in der Schule, 1983, oil on canvas, 220 x 320 cm, TH-1983-B-01

Thomas Huber is an artist who fuses image and text and lectures on his pictures. He realises his conception of the image in various mediums: paintings, aquarelle, drawings, objects, graphic arts, art within architecture, artist lectures, and artists' books. For instance, his painting Rede in der Schule ("Lecture in the School") depicts the main auditorium in the Kunstakademie Düsseldorf.

Rather than showing realities in his work, Huber, like an architect, interweaves the picture space with design structures and allows motifs such as diamonds and squares to become a determining element of the work. Accompanying philosophical and poetic texts demonstrate that the picture space is seen as "a meaning space and the picture depth as profundity".

The artist says about his work: "My pictures show spaces. You can see them but you can't get to them; it is as if they are sealed behind clear glass. The picture is a promise that cannot be honoured, it is a wistful, sad thing."

Thomas Huber's painting reveals an ironic and imaginary world. His work stages a complex process of symbolisation that resorts to sophisticated techniques of representation: systematic mise en abîme, co-presence of different temporalities or apparently contradictory elements, in illusionist spaces, between classical and utopian architecture. His work fundamentally questions the possibility of representation.

His paintings both suck in and exclude the viewer. The painting marks the place of encounter between the painting's own appearance and the hidden depth of the image, the mise en abyme underlining its enigma. For Thomas Huber, the painting is also a "social" place, the place of encounter with the viewer. If the artist is indeed the creator of the image, he also becomes its guardian. Faced with the catastrophic reflections reflected by the world, the artist, in his work, will never cease to account for them, but also, illusorily, to try to tidy up the mess and to attempt to repair the visible damage.

Thomas Huber is known for his mise en abîme and dream-like style, and has drawn and painted watercolours inspired from the natural world. His village studio in Italy provided many natural subjects, including the view of Lake Maggiore, the Swiss mountains to the north and the Italian mountains to the south.

Literally fascinated by the landscape, the lake, the mountains, by the effects of light, by the colours of the seasons and the depth and majesty of the spaces, he developed a kind of diary: every day, in the morning, at noon or in the evening, he draws and paints what he sees. He paints "reality" but through the filter of his emotions and feelings. This series of works is a tribute to the beauty and simplicity of landscapes, it is an invitation to observation, meditation, elevation of the spirit and a form of humility and respect in the face of the majesty of Nature. A monographic exhibition dedicated to Lake Maggiore was held in MASI Lugano in 2023–2024.

== Awards ==
- 1984: Kiefer-Hablitzer Foundation Prize
- 1985: Grant from Kunstfonds, Bonn
- 1987: Rheinbrücke (today Manor Cultural Prize), Basel
- 1989/1990: Award from the Kulturkreis im Bundesverband der Deutschen Industrie [Federal Association of German Industry], Berlin
- 1993: Prize for Young Swiss Art from the Zürcher Kunstgesellschaft (Kunstpreis der Stadt Zürich)
- 1993: Kunstpreis der Stadtsparkasse Düsseldorf
- 1995: Niedersächsischer Kunstpreis, Hannover
- 1999: Art Multiple Prize, Düsseldorf (today Cologne Fine Art & Antiques-Preis), Cologne
- 2005: Prize of the Heitland Foundation (Kunstpreis der Heitland Foundation, Celle)
- 2013: Prix Meret Oppenheim, Bern

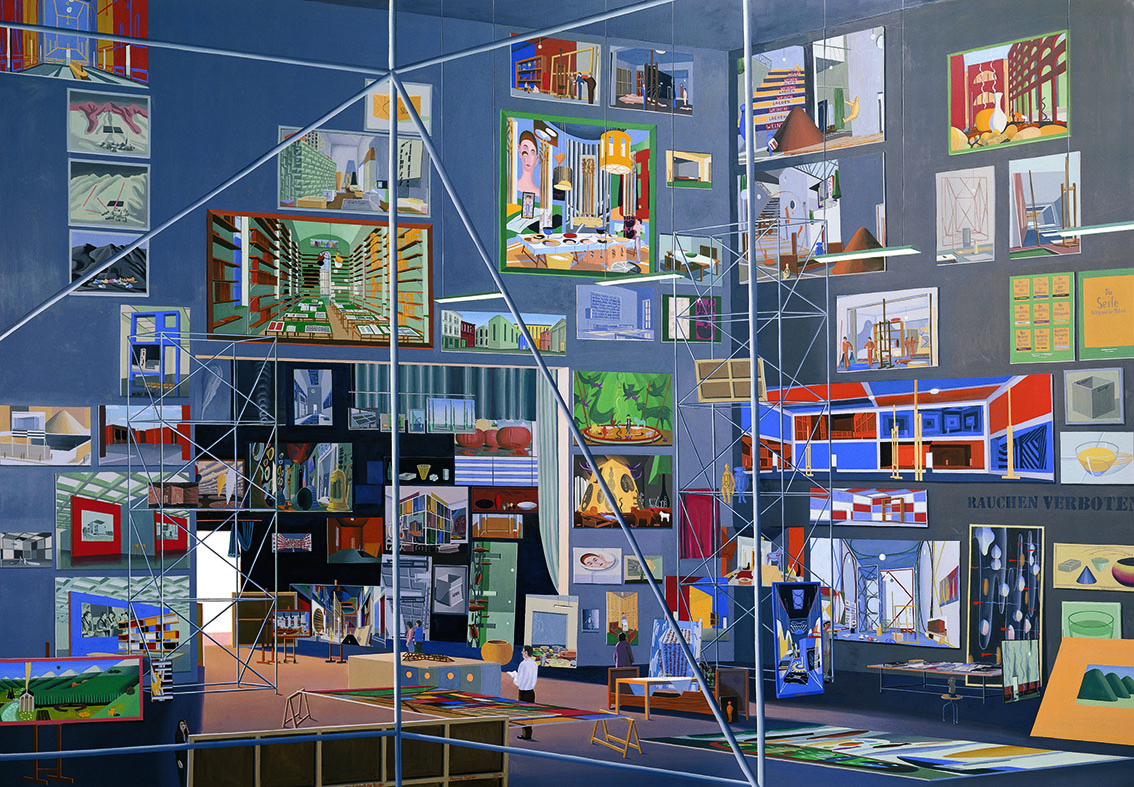
Das Kabinett der Bilder, 2004, oil on canvas, 250 x 360 cm, Aargauer Kunsthaus in Aarau, Switzerland

== Major exhibitions ==
- Thomas Huber, Lago Maggiore, Lugano: MASI (2023–2024)
- Thomas Huber, A l'horizon, Musée des Beaux Arts de Rennes (2017)
- Thomas Huber, extase, Paris: Centre Culturel Suisse (2017)
- Thomas Huber, Der Rote Fries, Toulouse: Festival international d'art de Toulouse, L'Espace EDF Bazacle (2014).
- Thomas Huber, Vous êtes ici. Thomas Huber est au Mamco, Geneva: Mamco, musée d'art moderne et contemporain (2012).
- Thomas Huber, rauten traurig / la langueur des losanges, travelling exhibition: Herford: MARTa Herford; Nîmes: carré d'art, musée d'art contemporain; Tübingen: Kunsthalle Tübingen (2008–2009).
- Thomas Huber, Das Kabinett der Bilder/ Het Schilderkabinet, retrospective exhibition: Aarau: Aargauer Kunsthaus; Rotterdam: Museum Boijmans Van Beuningen; Krefeld: Kaiser Wilhelm Museum and Haus Lange (2004–2005).
- Thomas Huber, Huberville. Sonnez les matines, Rochechouart: Musée départemental d'art contemporain (2003).
- Thomas Huber, Glockenläuten / Laat der kokken luiden / Sonnez les matines, Brussels: Palais des Beaux-Arts; Zurich: Helmhaus Zürich; Wolfsburg: Städtische Galerie Wolfsburg (2000).
- Thomas Huber, Die Bank. Eine Wertvorstellung / Der Duft des Geldes, Utrecht: Centraal Museum Utrecht; Hanover: Kestner-Gesellschaft; Frankfurt am Main: Museum für Moderne Kunst; Zurich: Kunsthaus Zürich (1991–1993).
- Thomas Huber, Die Urgeschichte der Bilder / La Préhistoire des Tableaux, Basel: Museum für Gegenwartskunst; Berlin: Neuer Berliner Kunstverein; Friedrichshafen: Städtisches Bodensee-Museum, Munster: Westfälischer Kunstverein, Regensburg: Städtische Galerie im leeren Beutel; Strasbourg: Les Musées de la Ville de Strasbourg (1987–1988).
- Thomas Huber, Sept Lieux, Paris: Centre Georges Pompidou, installation of all his former works as the reconstruction of their original exhibition venues (1988–1989).
- Thomas Huber, Ein öffentliches Bad für Münster, in: Skulptur Projekte Münster ´87, Munster: Cathedral Square And Westfälisches Landesmuseum für Kunst und Kulturgeschichte (1987).
- Thomas Huber, Der Besuch im Atelier, Düsseldorf: Exhibition Centre Fairground Hall 13 in the exhibition "von hier aus" (1984).

== Work groups (selection) ==
The Red Frieze (2013–2014), You Are Here (2012), sad facets (2005–2007), Cabinet of Paintings (2004), Theoretical Paintings I and II (2001–2003; 2010–2011), The Peal of the Bells (1999–2000), The Bank (1991–1993), The Library (1988), The Picture Storeroom/Opus (1988), Wedding (1985–1986), The Visit in the Studio (1984), Talk in the School (1983), Talk on Creation (1982), Talk on the Great Flood (1982).

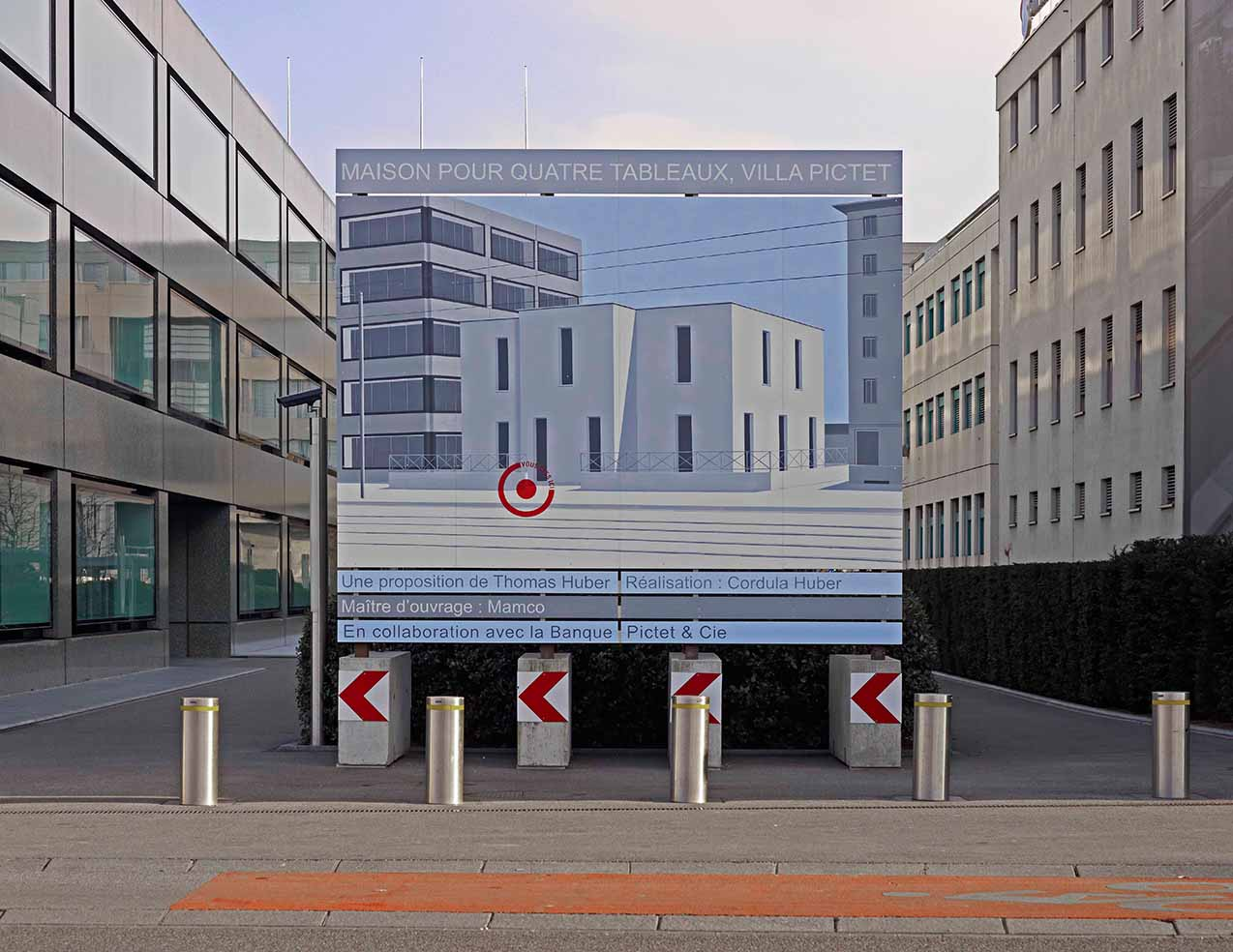
Maison pour quatre tableaux, Villa Pictet, 2012, billboard, Mamco, Genf, TH-2012-BS-05

== Artist books (selection) ==
- Thomas Huber, Lago Maggiore, MASI Lugano and galerie Skopia Geneva, 2023
- Thomas Huber, L'Enseigne / Das Ladenschild / The Shopsign, galerie Skopia, Geneva [de, fr, en], 2014
- Thomas Huber, Mesdames et Messieurs: Conférences 1982–2010, with a foreword by Stefan Kunz. Geneva: Mamco, 2012
- Thomas Huber, rauten traurig / la langueur des losanges / sad facets, MARTa Herford (ed.); Kunsthalle Tübingen; Musée d'Art Contemporain de Nîmes, Kerber Verlag, Bielefeld, 2008, [de, fr, en], Bielefeld/Leipzig: Kerber Verlag, 2008
- Thomas Huber, Das Kabinett der Bilder, Aargauer Kunsthaus Aarau, 2004; Museum Boijmans Van Beuningen, Rotterdam, 2004; Kaiser Wilhelm Museum, Krefeld, 2005. Ed. by Beat Wismer, Essays by Oskar Bätschmann and others. Baden: Verlag Lars Müller Publishers, 2004
- Thomas Huber, Die Bibliothek in Aarau, Aargauer Kunsthaus Aarau (ed.), Baden: Verlag Lars Müller Publishers, 2003 (Schriften zur Aargauischen Kunstsammlung)
- Thomas Huber, Glockenläuten / Sonnez les matines / The Peal of the Bells, Palais des Beaux-Arts, Brussels; Helmhaus, Zürich; Städtische Galerie Wolfsburg (ed.), 2000
- Thomas Huber, Schauplatz, Kunstverein Düsseldorf; Stadthaus Ulm, 1998–1999. Ed. by Raimund Stecker. Düsseldorf: Richter Verlag, 1998
- Thomas Huber, Das Studio, Stadtsparkasse Düsseldorf, 1993. Darmstadt: Häusser Verlag, 1993
- Thomas Huber, Das Bild. Texte 1980–1992. Ed. by Carl Haenlein. Hannover, 1992
- Thomas Huber, Der Duft des Geldes. Die Bank. Eine Wertvorstellung. Centraal Museum Utrecht (ed.); Kestner-Gestellschaft, Hanover; Kunsthaus Zürich, Conception: Thomas Huber, Ellen de Bruijne, Let Geerling. Darmstadt: Häusser Verlag, 1992
- Thomas Huber, Die Urgeschichte der Bilder / La préhistoire des tableaux. Öffentliche Kunstsammlung Basel, Museum für Gegenwartskunst (ed.), 1987; Les Musées de la Ville de Strasbourg, 1988. Essays by Jörg Zutter and Thomas Huber. Basel, 1987
- Thomas Huber, Rede in der Schule, Vista Point, Cologne, 1986, with 24 illustrations and slides
