= Martina Gmür =

Swiss visual artist (b. 1979)

Martina Gmür (born 1979) is a Swiss visual artist. She works within many genres, including installation art, painting, drawing, performance art, and sculpture. She lives in Basel.

== Early life and education ==
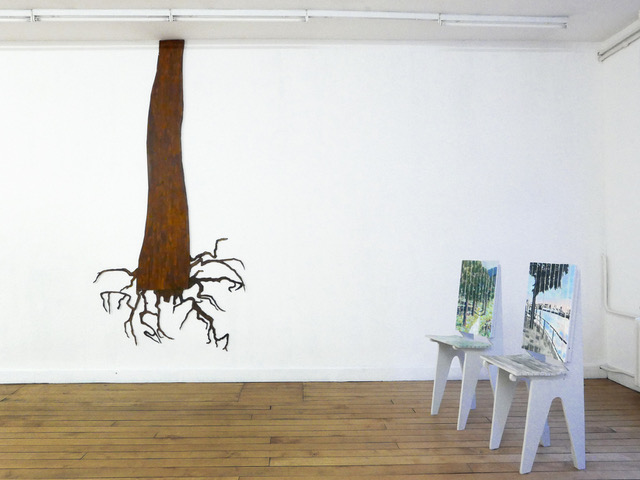
Roots (2019, oil on panel) by Martina Gmür at Galerie Stampa, Basel

Martina Gmür was born on 6 August 1979 in Münster, Valais, Switzerland (now Goms, Valais). She attended École de design et haute école d'art du Valais in Sierre from 1996 to 1999; and the Hochschule für Gestaltung und Kunst in Basel from 1999 to 2002.

== Career ==
In 2007, she was awarded the Manor Cultural Prize for the Canton of Valais; and in 2000, she was awarded the UBS Art Award, by the UBS Culture Foundation and funded by the investment bank UBS.

Her works are represented in the museum collection of the Kunstkredit Basel-Stadt, the Kunsthaus Baselland, the Musée d'Art du Valais, and in the Kunstmuseum Thun.
