= Caro Niederer =

Swiss artist (born 1963)

- Born: 1963 (age 62–63); Zurich, Switzerland
- Occupation: Contemporary artists

Caro Niederer (born 1963 in Zürich) is a contemporary artist who lives and works in Zürich.

Niederer works in a variety of media. Her work encompasses techniques such as painting, photography, video as well as silk tapestries. Niederer is, along with Pipilotti Rist and Sylvie Fleury, one of the most popular contemporary female Swiss artists. Human day-to-day situations from her private life and her immediate environment are the source for most of Niederer's works. These personal snapshots are then re-worked in paintings or form the template for huge hand knotted silk carpets, which the artist gets produced in China. The transformation of an image through its replication in another media is a core theme of Niederer's work. In an ongoing photo series called Interieurs Niederer photographs her sold works in situ in their new owners' homes and offices.

Recent major museums exhibitions include Kunstmuseum St.Gallen (2017/2018), CAC Malaga (2006), Haus Lange, Krefeld (2006), Douglas Hyde Gallery, Dublin (2005), Ikon Gallery, Birmingham (2005) and Kunstmuseum St. Gallen (2004).

== Exhibitions ==
=== Solo exhibitions ===
1990

- Cairo Atelier, Cairo, Egypt
- Souvenirs, Kunsthaus Oerlikon, Zurich, Switzerland

1992

- Säntis, curated by Hans-Ulrich Obrist, Säntis Bergstation, Schwaegalp, Switzerland,

1993

- Kunsthalle St. Gallen, St. Gallen, Switzerland

1994

- Abbilder, Ausstellungsraum Künstlerhaus Stuttgart, Stuttgart, Germany

1995

- Öffentliche und Private Bilder, Kunstverein Friedrichshafen, Germany

2003

- Memoria e Valore, Le Case d'Arte, Milan, Italy

2004

- Leben mit Kunst / Living with Art, Kunstmuseum St. Gallen, St.Gallen, Switzerland (travelling exhibition)

2005

- The Douglas Hyde Gallery, Dublin, Ireland
- Leben mit Kunst / Living with Art, Ikon Gallery, Birmingham, UK (travelling exhibition)

2006

- Leben mit Kunst / Living with Art, Haus Lange, Krefeld, Germany (travelling exhibition)
- Souvenir and Conversations, CAC – Centro de Arte Contemporaneo de Málaga, Malaga, Spain

2017

- Good Life Ceramics, Kunstmuseum St. Gallen, St.Gallen, Switzerland

2018

- Good Life Ceramics, Kunstmuseum St.Gallen, St. Gallen, Switzerland
- Print Works, Kunstgriff, Zurich, Switzerland

2019

- Good Luck, complete Works, Geneva, Switzerland

=== Group exhibitions ===
1988

- Junge Schweizer KünstlerInnen, Stiftung Merian, Muba 88, Basel, Switzerland

1989

- Kunsthaus Oerlikon, Zurich, Switzerland

1992

- Blumen, Bilderraum, Zurich, Switzerland

1993

- Informationsdienst c/o, Palais des Beaux Arts, Brussels, Belgium, (travelling exhibition)
- Informationsdienst c/o, Goethe House, New York, USA, (travelling exhibition)
- Informationsdienst c/o, Grazer Kunstverein, Graz, Austria, (travelling exhibition)
- Informationsdienst c/o, Sous-sol, Geneva, Switzerland, (travelling exhibition)
- Serial – Ein limitierter Laden von Michelle Nicol, Zurich, Switzerland

1994

- Eidgenössisches Kunststipendium 1994, Messe Basel, Basel, Switzerland
- Merry-go-round, Shedhalle, Zurich, Switzerland
- Werk- und Atelierstipendium 1994, Helmhaus Zürich, Zurich, Switzerland

1995

- Inventar 95/96, Helmhaus Zürich, Zurich, Switzerland
- SüdwestLB Druckgraphik Kunstpreis 1995, SüdwestLB Forum, Stuttgart, Germany
- Werk- und Atelierstipendium 1995, Helmhaus Zürich, Zurich, Switzerland

1996

- Auszug, Kunstverein Friedrichshafen, Friedrichshafen, Germany
- Doppelbindung / Linke Masche, Kunstverein München, Munich, Germany
- !Hello world?, Museum für Gestaltung, Zurich, Switzerland

1997

- Alpenblick, die zeitgenössische Kunst und das Alpine, Kunsthalle Wien, Vienna, Austria
- Geschlossene Gesellschaft, Graphische Sammlung der ETH Zürich, Zurich, Switzerland
- Kunst & Kiosk (with Véronique Zusseau), Alte Konsumbäckerei, Solothurn, Switzerland
- Objets du désir, Museum Bellerive, Zurich, Switzerland
- SüdwestLB Druckgraphik Kunstpreis 1997, SüdwestLB Forum, Stuttgart, Germany

1998

- Geschlossene Gesellschaft, Kunstmarkt Dresden, Dresden, Germany
- Non-Painters-Painting, Galerie Berlintokio, Berlin, Germany
- Salon, Kunstverein St. Gallen, St. Gallen, Switzerland
- Wish you were here (with Andreas Rüthi und Bruno Müller-Meyer), Milch, London, UK

1999

- Bunte Hintergründe und klassische Porträts (with Bruno Müller-Meyer),

2000

- Kontext, Kunsthalle Kornwestheim, Germany

2001

- WertWechsel, Museum für Angewandte Kunst, Cologne, Germany

2002

- Heimspiel, Zeughaus Teufen, Teufen, Switzerland
- Interior / Exterior (with A. Goldsworthy), Cultureel Centrum De Romaanse Poort, Leuven, Belgium

2003

- Heimspiel, Kunsthalle St. Gallen, St. Gallen, Switzerland

2004

- Appenzeller Frauenaufzug, Zeughaus Teufen, Teufen, Switzerland
- Citazioni, Le Case d'Arte, Milan, Italy
- Kunst für die Kunst, Kunsthalle St. Gallen, St. Gallen, Switzerland

2005

- Painting the Edge, Gallery Hyundai, Seoul, Korea

2006

- Hyperdesign, Shanghai Biennale, Shanghai, China

2009

- Gefrorene Momente / Frozen Moments, Kunstmuseum Chur, Chur, Switzerland
- Heimspiel 09, Kunstmuseum St. Gallen, St. Gallen, Switzerland
- Locating Home, Harewood House, Harewood, UK
- Tracing Reality I, Kunstraum Riehen, Riehen, Switzerland

2012

- The Art on your Wall, Artclub 1563, Seoul, Korea
- Das eigene Kind im Blick, Kunsthalle Emden, Emden, Germany
- Heimspiel, Kunstmuseum St. Gallen, St. Gallen, Switzerland
- The Prestige of Painting from Europe: The Future Lasts Forever, Interalia Art Compagny, Seoul, Korea

2014

- Gastspiel. Schweizer Gegenwartskunst im Museum Rietberg, Zurich, Switzerland

2015

- Don't Shoot the Painter – UBS Art Collection, Villa Reale's Galleria d'Arte Moderna, Milan, Italy
- Heimspiel, Kunstmuseum St. Gallen, St. Gallen, Switzerland

2016

- A Being in the World, curated by Jayson Musson and Fabienne Stephan, Salon 94 Bowery, New York, USA

2020

- Conversations about Work. Kino Süd, Weiss Falk, Basel
- Sommer des Zögerns. Kunsthalle Zürich
- Subject sitting in a darkened room. Barbara Seiler, Zurich

== Public conversations ==
1997

- Wie entsteht das Wertvolle, with Christina Bechtler, Galerie Agathe Nisple, St.Gallen, Switzerland

2004

- Gespräche über die Arbeit, Zeughaus Teufen, Teufen, Switzerland

== Concepts and Projects ==
1992

- Oriental Spirit in Contemporary Zurich Flats, with Stephanie Thalmann, Video, 90’

1993

- Forum Information, with Marc Jancou, Galerie Marc Jancou, Zurich

1997

- World of Interiors, Janet Paris, Andreas Rüthi, Bridget Smith, Binz 39, Zurich

2016

- Glassware, MMperformance (UA) by Christoph Gallio und Caro Niederer,
- Aktionshalle Stanzerei, Baden, Switzerland

2017

- The Inventory of Happiness, Angela Weber Möbel, Zurich, Switzerland

== Awards and grants ==
- 1990: Pro Helvetia grant and studio in Schabramant, Cairo/EG
- 1992: AR-Kulturstiftung, grant
- 1995: Werkstipendium der Stadt Zurich
- 1996: AR-Kulturstiftung, grant
- 1997: IBK Förderpreis 1997
- 2000: AR-Kulturstiftung, grant
- 2004: Manor Kunstpreis
