= Kurt W. Forster =

Swiss architectural historian (1935–2024)

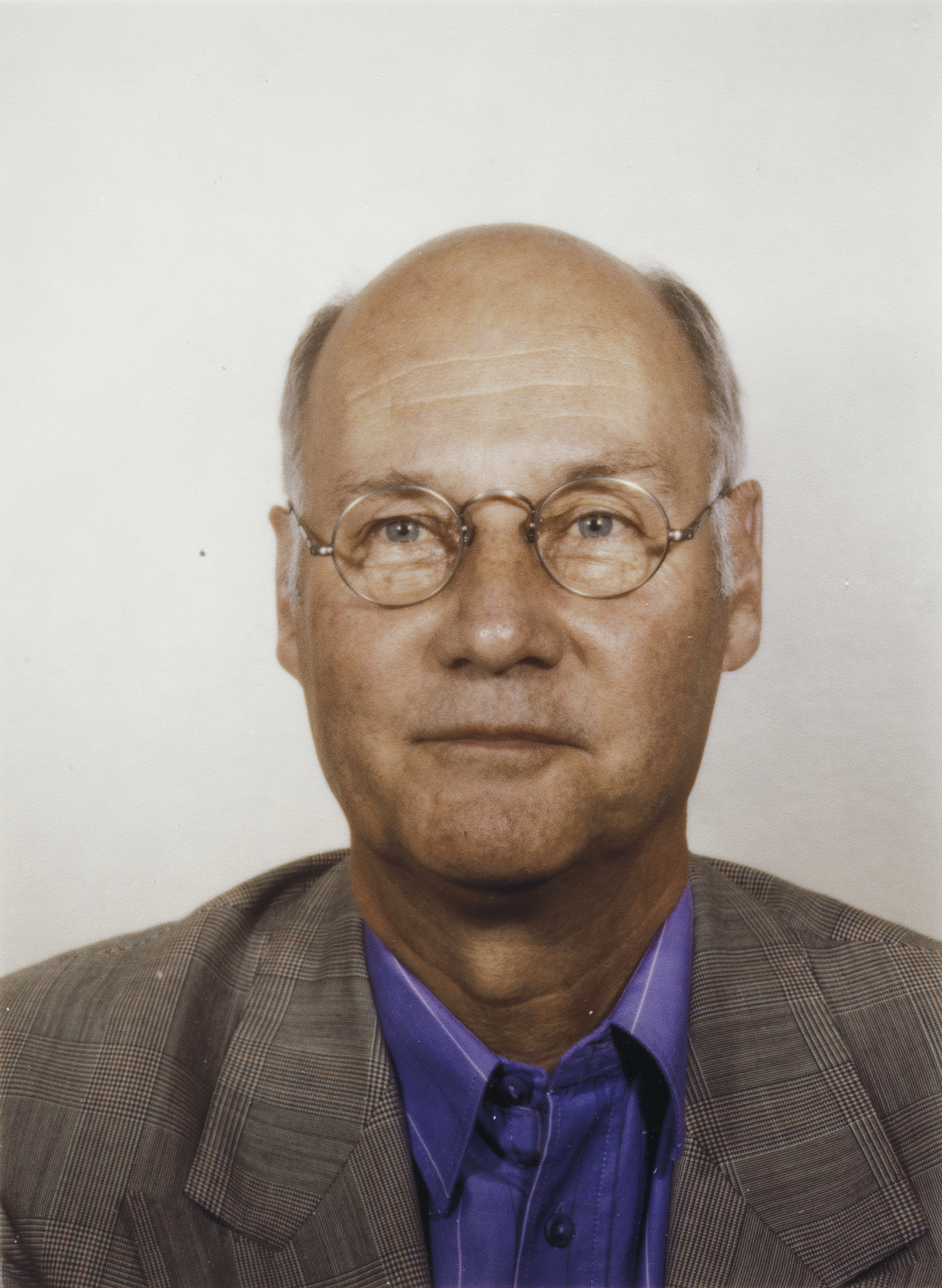
Image of Forster, Kurt W.

Kurt W. Forster (12 August 1935 – 6 January 2024) was a Swiss architectural historian and teacher. He was the past head of the doctoral studies program at the Yale School of Architecture and the former director of the Getty Research Institute (GRI), the Canadian Centre for Architecture (CCA), and the Venice Architecture Biennale. Zurich-born Forster died on 6 January 2024, at the age of 88 in New York.

In 2007, he received the Prix Meret-Oppenheim. In 2021, he received the Schinkel-Preis der Fontanestadt Neuruppin.
