= Günther Vogt =

Liechtensteiner landscape architect (born 1957)

Günther Vogt (born 1957) is a Liechtensteiner landscape architect and professor emeritus.

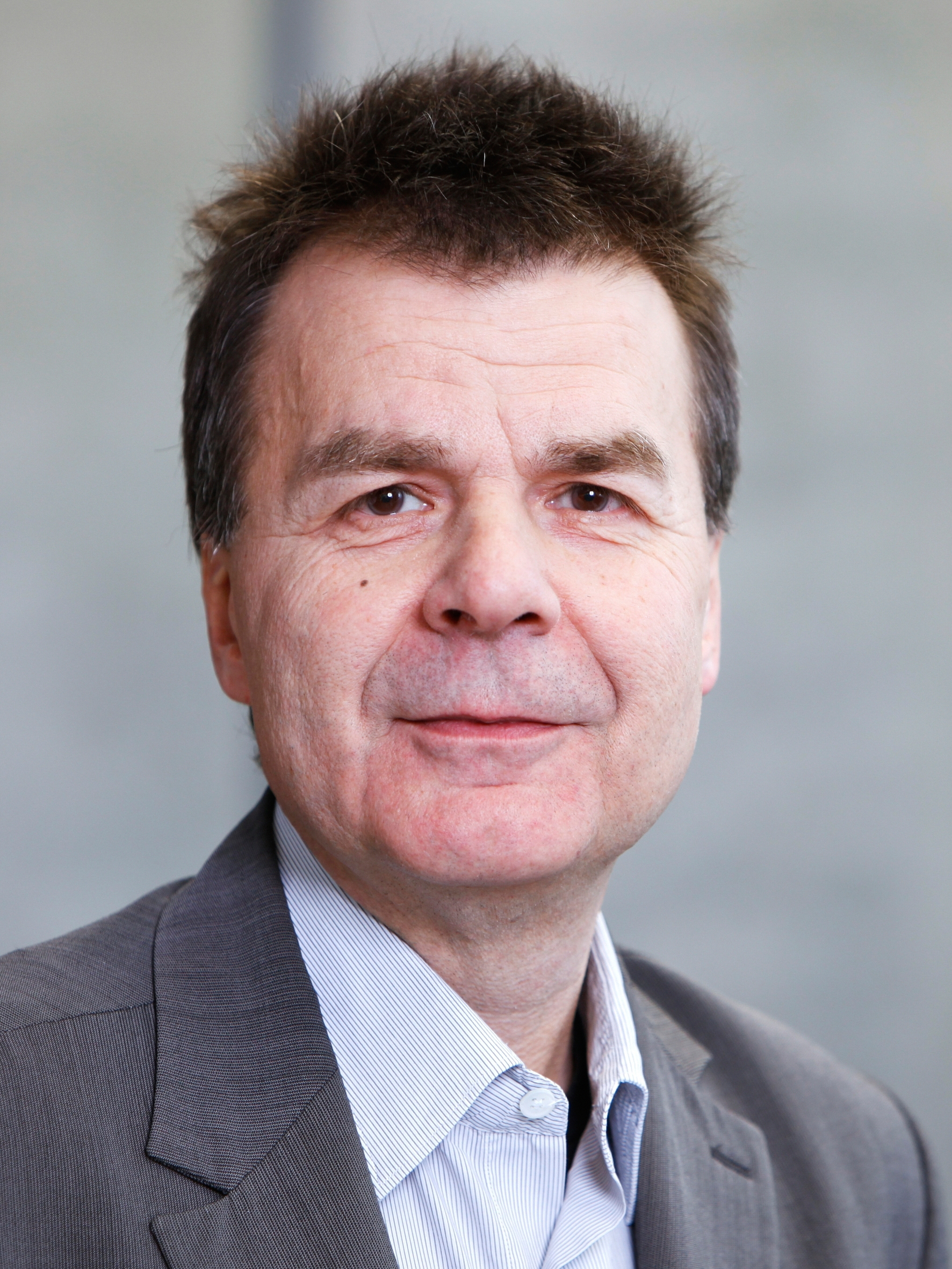
Günther Vogt in 2011

== Biography ==
Vogt was born in 1957 in Balzers. After training in horticulture in Bern, he studied landscape architecture at the Intercantonal Technical College in Rapperswil. In 1987 he joined Stöckli, Kienast, Köppel and in 1995, together with Dieter Kienast, founded the office Kienast Vogt Partner. After Dieter Kienast's death, the office became VOGT Landschaftsarchitekten, Zürich, in 2000. This was followed by offices in Munich, Berlin and London. Günther Vogt taught at ETH Zurich (2005–2023) and at the Harvard Graduate School of Design (2012).

== Principal works ==
- 2001–2005: Allianz Arena, Munich (architects: Herzog & de Meuron)
- 1995–2007: Tate Modern, London (architects: Herzog & de Meuron)
- 1997–2007: Kolumba Kunstmuseum, Köln (architect: Peter Zumthor)
- 2006–2010: The Green Novartis Campus, Basel (architect: Frank O. Gehry)
- 2005–2013: European Central Bank, Frankfurt (architects: Coop Himmelb(l)au)
- 2013: Masoala Rain Forest Hall Towers, Zoo Zürich (architects: Gautschi Storrer)
- 2013–2020: Quai Zürich Campus, Zürich (architect: Adolf Krischanitz)
- 2022: 1st prize St. Luzibrücke, Chur (engineers: Conzett Bronzini Partner and Schlaich Bergermann & Partner, architects: Jüngling & Hagmann)

== Awards ==
- 2010: Schulthess garden prize
- 2012: Prix Meret-Oppenheim

== Former employees ==
- Maurus Schifferli

== Literature ==
- Günther Vogt: "Miniature and Panorama - Vogt Landscape Architects' Work 2000-2006", Lars Müller Publishers 2006, ISBN 3-03778-068-1
- Alice Foxley, Vogt Landscape Architects: "Distance and Engagement - Walking, Thinking and Making Landscape", Lars Müller Publishers, 2010, ISBN 978-3-03778-196-8
- Dominique Ghiggi, Chair Günther Vogt, Department of Architecture, ETH Zurich: "Baumschule - Kultivierung des Stadtdschungels", Lars Müller Publishers, 2010, ISBN 978-3-03778-217-0
- Franziska Bark, Günther Vogt Chair, Department of Architecture, ETH Zurich: "Versuche das Glück im Garten zu finden", Lars Müller Publishers, 2011, ISBN 978-3-03778-247-7
- Günther Vogt: "Miniature and Panorama - Vogt Landscape Architects Projects 2000-2012", Lars Müller Publishers, 2012, ISBN 978-3-03778-233-0
