= Fritz Schwegler =

German artist (1935–2014)

- Born: May 7, 1935; Breech, Swabia
- Died: June 3, 2014
- Known for: Painting, sculpture, design

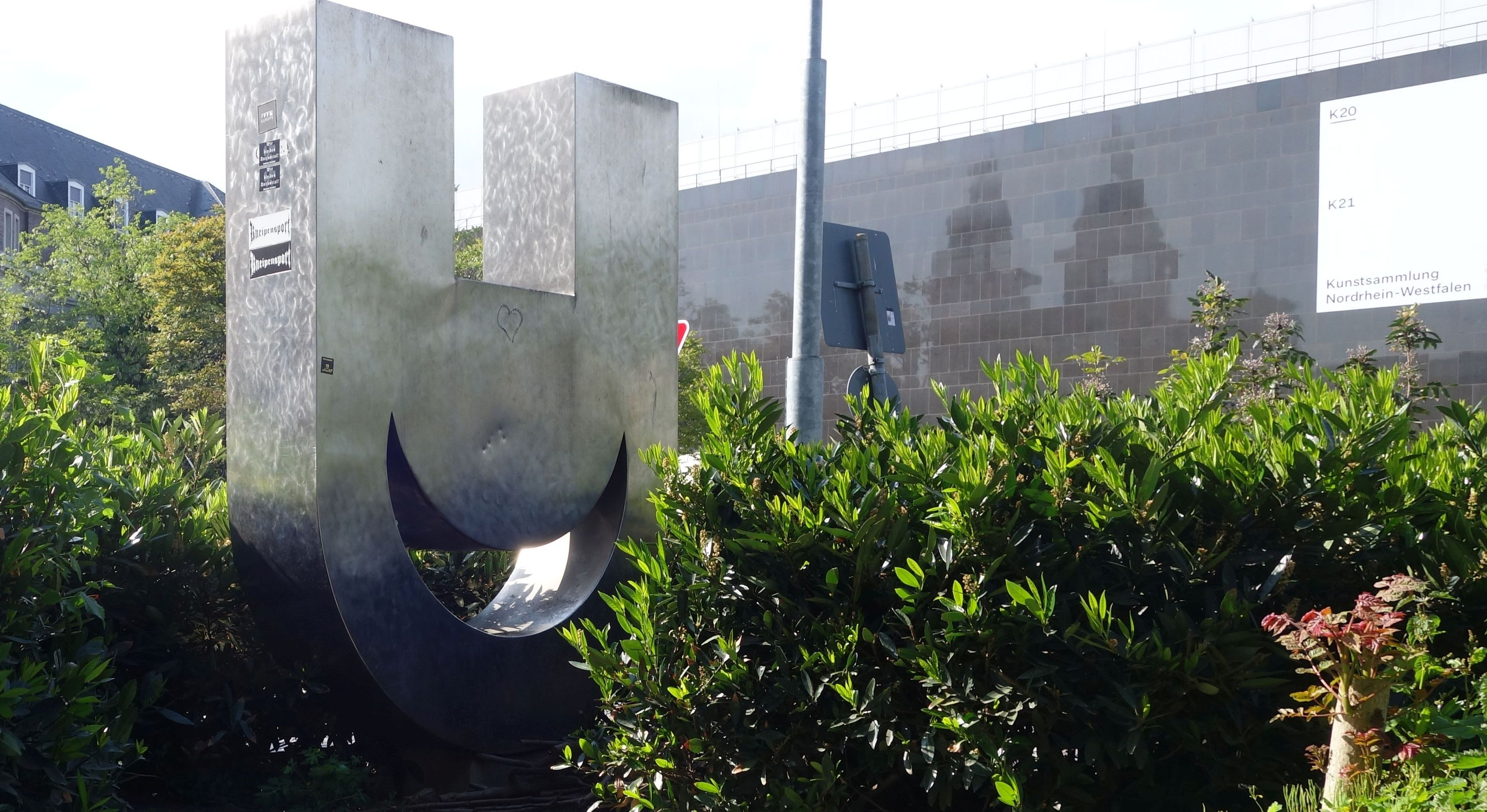
U-Thant (1969), Düsseldorf

Fritz Schwegler (7 May 1935 – 3 June 2014) was a German painter, graphic artist, sculptor and musician.

== Life and work ==
Born in the Swabian town of Breech near Göppingen, Schwegler was first apprenticed as a joiner to his father. He then traveled through the whole of Europe for three years, where he visited 21 cities. As an artist, he first created image collages and spoken performances, entitled "Effeschiaden", "Effeschiadiana", "Effeschiaturen", "Moritafeln", "Zehnerschaften", "Viererreihen" and "Urnotizen", accompanied by photographs and film sequences. He later made wooden sculptures and a thousand from bronze.

Schwegler exhibited at the documentas 5 and 8 in Kassel. In 1999 he received the Hans Thoma Prize, and in 2003 he was awarded the Bernhard Heiliger Award of Sculpture for outstanding achievements in the field of sculpture. According to the jurors, Werner Spies, Manfred Schneckenburger and Dominic van den Boogerd, "at the end of the 20th century", he "created a register of plastic art without comparison".

For three decades, Schwegler was a professor at the Kunstakademie Düsseldorf, where he was in close contact with Joseph Beuys. He retired in 2001. Among his students were Thomas Demand, Katharina Fritsch, Martin Honert, Thomas Huber, and Thomas Schütte. He married the sculptor Gudrun Krüger.

== Select bibliography ==
- Wolfgang Becker, Astrid Brock, eds., Fritz Schwegler: Effeschiadiana, Effeschiaden, Effeschiaturen, Moritafeln, Zehnerschaften, Viererreihen und Urnotizen. Exhibition catalog. Stadt Aachen, Neue Galerie-Sammlung Ludwig, 19 Jan. - 10 February 1974.
- Joachim Heusinger von Waldegg, Peter Kleemann, Marianne Roetzel, Fritz Schwegler. Rheinisches Landesmuseum Bonn, 1974.
- Helga Meister, "Fritz Schwegler", in Die Kunstszene Düsseldorf. Recklinghausen, 1979, pp. 182–184.
- Fritz Schwegler: Kunst der Erscheinung konnte so sein: Kleidungen zum Fünfzigsten. Düsseldorf, 1992.
- Lothar Romain, Fritz Schwegler: Erscheinungsmaßnahmen und Abulvenz. Hagen, 1983.
- Fritz Schwegler: Kohle, Wasser, Benzin. Strasbourg, 1996.
- Ferdinand Ullrich and Hans-Jürgen Schwalm, eds., Fritz Schwegler: die tägliche Jubelrolle; 365 Öffnungen; nach 25 Jahren und 29 von 1000 Notwandlungsstücken (hier zurückgemalt). Exhibition catalog. Kunsthalle Recklinghausen, 1999.
- Helga Meister, Und keiner hinkt. 22 Wege vom Schwegler wegzukommen. Kleve and Düsseldorf, 2001.
- Ulrike Groos, ed., Das unbewegliche Theater des Fritz Schwegler von Breech. Ostfildern: Hatje Cantz, 2004.
