= Swiss Chileans =

Chilean citizens of Swiss ancestry

Swiss Chileans helvético-chileno/suizo-chileno Schweizerchilenen Svizzero-cileno Suisse-chilien Svizzer-chileno
Total population
- +90,000 and 100,000; 0.6% population of Chile

Regions with significant populations
- Punta Arenas, Valparaíso, Temuco, Santiago de Chile

Languages
- Chilean Spanish, German, French, Italian, Romansh

Religion
- Christianity (Protestantism and Roman Catholic), Jewish minorities

Related ethnic groups
- Swiss people, Swiss diaspora, German Chileans, French, and Italian Chileans

Swiss Chileans are Chilean citizens of Swiss ancestry. There are currently 15,000 Swiss citizens residing in Chile, with approximately 90,000 descendants of the 19th century immigrants.

== Immigration to Chile ==
Due to confusion with that of German, French, and Italian immigrants, the actual number of Swiss Chileans varies from one source to another. In 1881, 28 years after colonization by Germans in southern Chile, special agencies were authorized to recruit Swiss emigrants. These arrived in three key periods:

Years	Number of immigrants	Areas settled
1876 to 1877	119 families (from Fribourg canton)	Magallenes region
1883 to 1900	36,621 (primarily from Valais canton)	Southern region (Victoria and Traiguén in Araucanía)
1915 to 1950	30,000	Central region (Santiago and Valparaiso)

Between April 1876 and May 1877, a contingent received government land grants consisting of hectares of forest, woodland, and scrub land in the Magallanes Region (Agua Fresca, next to Punta Arenas). These farmers proceeded to transform the region into agricultural lands suitable for pasture and crop farming.

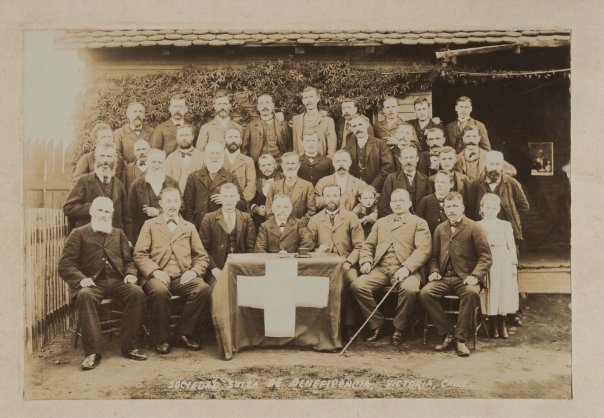
Swiss Benevolent Society in Victoria, Araucanía Region.

In 1880, Don Francisco De B. Echeverría was appointed to lead the Agency for Colonization and Immigration. Agent General Benjamin Davila Larrain was entrusted with the recruitment of settlers.

Following the end of resistance to occupation by indigenous Mapuche in the 1880s, large areas of land were advertised to European settlers, many of whom were experiencing economic hardship. The Chilean government invited Swiss emigrants on the condition they settle in Araucanía, to cultivate it and create arable land for crops and livestock. The first contingent departed in November 1883; their success would direct future emigration authorizations. Land grants were awarded to an estimated 8,000+ families .

The preparation of the convoys meant the operation of a real network. Shipping companies, especially the English "Company of the Pacific", ensured the French port of Bordeaux as a regular line which had the steamships Valparaíso Cotopaxi, Potosi, Sorata, The Valparaíso, Aconcagua and Britain, among others, as the main boats that sailed Swiss settlers.

== Mass immigration ==
The first large group of immigrants composed of 1,311 families landed in Valparaíso on 19 December 1883. Between 1883 and 1886 they were shipped to the territory of Araucanía; 12,602 Swiss, representing 7% of emigration Switzerland overseas. The operations continued to evolve until 1890, when 22,708 Swiss were spread over the 31 colonies in the heart of the Araucania; 72.7% of emigrants settled in the 7 most important colonies of the time: Victoria, Traiguén, Faja Maisan, Temuco, Quino, Galvarino, Ercilla, and Pitrufquen.

The last recorded mass exodus of Swiss to Chile, during 1915 to 1950, recorded 30,000 residents installed in the central region, primarily in Santiago and Valparaíso.

== Notable Chileans of Swiss descent ==
- Hernán Büchi, economist, politician
- Jean Philippe Cretton, TV presenter, musician
- Karen Doggenweiler, journalist, TV hostess
- Kristel Köbrich Schimpl, swimmer
- Stefan Kramer, actor, comedian
- Eduardo Frei Montalva, President of Chile (1964–1970)
- Eduardo Frei Ruiz-Tagle, President of Chile (1994–2000)
- Fernando Matthei, former Commander in Chief of the Chilean Air force
- Evelyn Matthei, minister
- Felipe Seymour, football (soccer) player
- Ingrid Wildi Merino, video artist

== See also ==
- Basque Chilean
- Greeks in Chile
- Austrian Chilean
- British Chilean
- German Chilean
- French Chilean
- Italian Chilean
