= Kunstmuseum Winterthur =

Coordinates: 47°30′05″N 8°43′49″E

Kunst Museum Winterthur
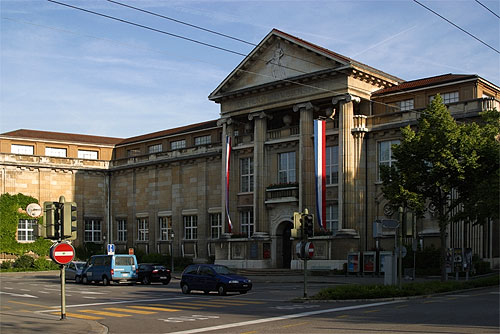
- Location: Winterthur, Switzerland
- Type: Art museum
- Website: www.kmw.ch

The Kunst Museum Winterthur (The Winterthur Museum of Art) is an art museum in Winterthur, Switzerland run by the local Kunstverein. From its beginnings, the activities of the Kunstverein Winterthur were focused on contemporary art – first Impressionism, then Post-Impressionism and especially Les Nabis, through post-World War II and recently created works by Richard Hamilton, Mario Merz and Gerhard Richter.

== Building ==
The Kunstmuseum Winterthur is made up of three buildings: the Beim Stadthaus, the Reinhart am Stadtgarten and Villa Flora.

Architects Rittmeyer & Furrer designed the original museum Beim Stadthaus in 1915, and a 1000 m^{2} modernist addition was designed by Gigon/Guyer in 1995. The building "Beim Stadthaus" also contains Winterthur's natural history museum.

== Collection ==
The main focus of the museum's collection has always been impressionism and post-impressionism. The impressionist gallery includes such notable works as:

- Low Tide, Claude Monet (1882)
- Under Hampton Court Bridge, Alfred Sisley (1874)
- Horse chestnuts of Jas de Bouffan, Paul Cézanne (1885)
- Dandelions, Vincent van Gogh (1889)

A sculpture gallery includes works by Eugène Delacroix and Alberto Giacometti. The cubism section contains works by Pablo Picasso, Mondrian, and Gris, as well as one of the most important European collections of Fernand Léger.

More modern works include pieces by Mark Tobey, Ellsworth Kelly, Brice Marden, Andro Wekua and Pia Fries.

== See also ==
- Am Römerholz
- List of museums in Switzerland
