= Inès Lamunière =

Swiss architect and professor

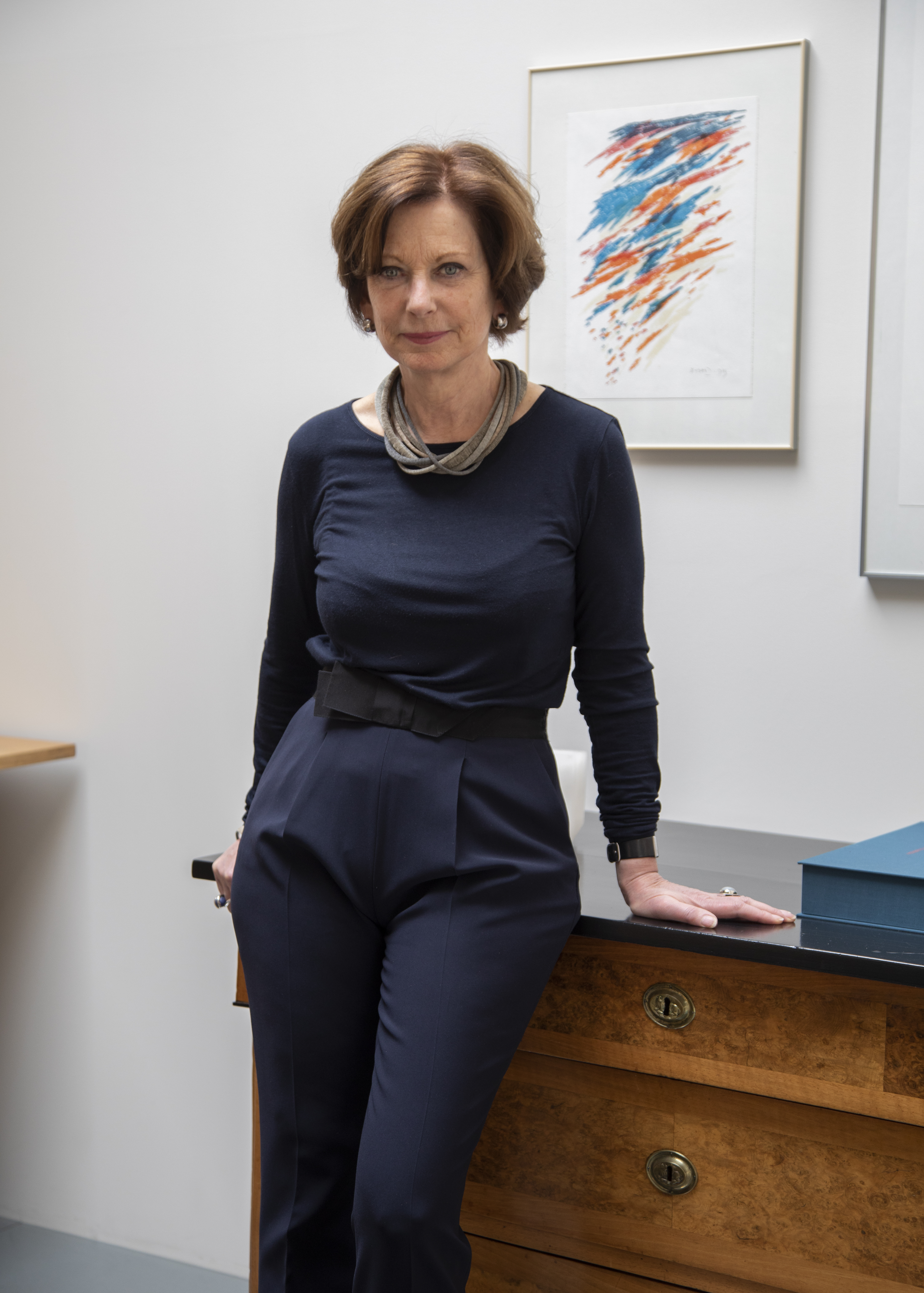
Inès Lamunière

Inès Lamunière, is a Swiss architect, b. 25 October 1954, Geneva, Switzerland.

== Early life, education, and career ==
Lamunière is the daughter of Swiss architect Jean-Marc Lamunière. She graduated from EPFL (École polytechnique fédérale de Lausanne) in 1980.

She studied architectural theory and history as a member of the Swiss Institute of Rome and then became an assistant to Professor Werner Oechslin at the Swiss Federal Institute of Technology (ETH Zurich). She was appointed Professor of Architectural Project Theory and Criticism at ETH.

In 1994, she moved to the EPFL (Ecole Polytechnique Fédérale de Lausanne), where in 2001 she founded and directed the Laboratory for Architecture and Urban Mobility (LAMU). Lamunière was three times visiting professor at the Graduate School of Design, Harvard University in 1996, 1999 and 2008 and is a guest lecturer and critic in Europe, North America and Asia.

She was co-editor of the architecture journal Faces in Geneva, from 1989 to 2004. In 2004, she published a book on the theory of urban architecture, Fo(u)r cities, followed in 2006 by an essay on the modern-day perception of threat and its impact on architecture, Habiter la menace, and an essay on complex architectural projects in relation to infrastructures, Objets risqués. All three works are published by Presses polytechniques universitaires romandes, Lausanne. Her book Enseigner l'architecture/Teaching architecture, Infolio et Birkhäuser, 2018, co-authored with Laurent Stalder, details her activities as a teacher and researcher.

In 1983, Lamunière founded and headed Devanthéry & Lamunière – architecture, heritage restoration and urban planning, in partnership with Patrick Devanthéry. Since 2007, she has been at the helm of the company, now called designlab-architecture SA, and in 2015 she took over the management with two new partners: Vincent Mas Durbec (architect DPLG/SIA) and Afonso Serpa (architect UAL).

== Prize ==
2011: Laureate of the Swiss Prix Meret-Oppenheim Award for the Arts.

2017: Received the French honour of Chevalier de l’ordre des Arts et des Lettres.

== Flagship projects ==
- 2020–2027 - The Ecumenical Centre, Geneva
- 2020–2025 - Pictet de Rochemont campus, Geneva
- 2020 - Restoration, conversion Ecole des Pâquis, Geneva
- 2019–2025 – Guiding principles and local plan, PAV Pointe Nord, Geneva
- 2018–2035 – Cornavin underground station, Geneva
- 2017 - Two office buildings, Le Berlingot, Nantes
- 2015 - Agroscope research laboratory, ACW, Changins Nyon
- 2014 - Two residential buildings, La Chapelle, Geneva
- 2014 - Villa, Vandoeuvres, Geneva
- 2013 - Intergenerational apartment building, Le Prieuré, Geneva
- 2012 - Lausanne Opera House, Lausanne
- 2012 - Batigène head office, amphitheatre district, Metz
- 2010 - Urban villa, Geneva
- 2010 - The Swiss Radio and Television tower, Geneva
- 2008 - Life Sciences faculty, EPFL, Lausanne
- 2007 - Philip Morris International head office, Lausanne
- 2006 - School and community centre, Cressy, Geneva
- 2004 - Alpine complex, Evolène
- 2004 - Novotel, Berne
- 2004 - Residential district, Neuchâtel
- 2003 - Psychiatric hospital, Yverdon-les-Bains
- 2003 - Primary school, Rolle
- 2000 - Fleuret Library, Lausanne University, Lausanne
- 2000 - Renovation of the west wing of Cornavin station, Geneva
- 2000 - Office of the daily newspaper Le Temps, Geneva
- 1999 - City Hall, Payerne
- 1999–2006 - Hôtel Cornavin, Geneva
- 1996 - Arditi-Wilsdorf Auditorium, UNIGE
- 1996 – Chamblandes high school, Pully
- 1995 – Primary school and leisure centre, Grand-Saconnex, Geneva
- 1993 – Student halls of residence, Protestant University Centre, Geneva

== Publications ==
- Lamunière, Inès; Stalder, Laurent (2019). Teaching architecture, a dialogue. Basel: Birkhäuser. ISBN 978-3-0356-1807-5.
- Lamunière, Inès (2015). Objets risqués (in French). Lausanne: Éditions PPUR. ISBN 978-2-88915-066-3.
- Kockelkorn, Anne; Stalder, Laurent (2011). Devanthéry & Lamunière, Image d'architecture - Deux Entretiens (in French). Paris: Infolio. ISBN 978-2-88474-494-2.
- Abram, Joseph; Caille, Jean-François; Caille, Emmanuel (2010). Devanthéry & Lamunière. Paris: Éditions Archibooks et Sautereau. ISBN 978-2-35733-091-7.
- Lamunière, Inès (2006). Habiter la Menace (in French). Lausanne: Éditions PPUR. ISBN 2-88074-650-7.
- Abram, Joseph (2005). Devanthéry & Lamunière. Pathfinders. Basel: Birkhäuser. ISBN 978-3-7643-7904-9.
- Lamunière, Inès (2004). Fo(u)r cities: Milan, Paris, Londres, New York (in French). Lausanne: Éditions PPUR. ISBN 2-88074-520-9.
- Abram, Joseph (2005). Devanthéry & Lamunière: four examples (in German and English). Boston: Birkhäuser. ISBN 0-8176-5435-6.
