= Catherine Leutenegger =

Swiss visual artist and photographer (born 1983)

Catherine Leutenegger (born 1983 in Lausanne) is a Swiss visual artist and photographer. She has been the recipient of many awards, including the Manor Cultural Prize, the Raymond Weil International Photography Prize and the Swiss Design Awards 2006 and 2008.

== Life and work ==
In 2001 Leutenegger gained a Baccalauréat, Certificat maturité Fédérale en section Arts Visuels, from Gymnase du Bugnon, Switzerland. In 2005 she gained a Bachelor in Visual Communication / Photography from École cantonale d'art de Lausanne (ECAL) in Switzerland. In 2007 she gained a Master in Photography, University of Art and Design from ECAL.

Her first book was titled Hors-champ and showed photographers' workspaces. It was published in 2006 by Infolio Publisher through the Manor Cultural Prize. This included a cash award and an exhibition at Musée de l’Elysée in Lausanne curated by William A. Ewing. In 2007, while taking part in an artist residency program in New York City, she started her project named The Kodak City. Her second photo essay, the Kodak City, was published on 9 September 2014 and looked at the demise of the once booming Kodak empire. It has been published online by Kehrer Verlag.

== Exhibitions ==
- Musée de l'Elysée, Lausanne
- Carla Sozzani Gallery, Milan
- Aperture Gallery, New York
- Museum für Gestaltung, Zürich
- Museum Bellerive, Zürich
- Fotomuseum Winterthur
- Bieler Fototage, Biel
- International Photography Festival, Leipzig

== Fellowships and awards ==
- 2005, Banque Cantonale Vaudoise Encouragement Prize
- 2006, Manor Cultural Prize, Lausanne
- 2006, Swiss Federal Design Grants
- 2007, Artist's Studio Grant (Canton de Vaud), Residency in New York City
- 2008, Swiss Federal Design Grants
- 2008, The Raymond Weil Club, International Photography Prize
