= Jocjonjosch =

jocjonjosch is an English-Swiss visual arts collective based in London, Zürich, and the Valais canton of Switzerland. The three members of JocJonJosch are Joschi Herczeg (b. 25/12/1975, Switzerland), Jonathan Brantschen (b. 30/09/1981, Switzerland) and Jocelyn Marchington (b. 29/06/1976, England).

== Work ==
Their work finds its form in performance, sculpture, photography, video, drawing, painting, and books, with a focus on issues of identity, specifically the ambiguity between the individual and the group.

== Exhibitions ==
In 2009 their work appeared in the Royal Academy of Arts' summer exhibition in London.

JocJonJosh won the Manor Kunstpreis in 2013 which led to a solo exhibition in the Musée d'Art du Valais, Switzerland.

Their work Eddy is included in the permanent collection of the Yorkshire Sculpture Park.
