= Aargauer Kunsthaus =

Swiss art museum and natural history museum

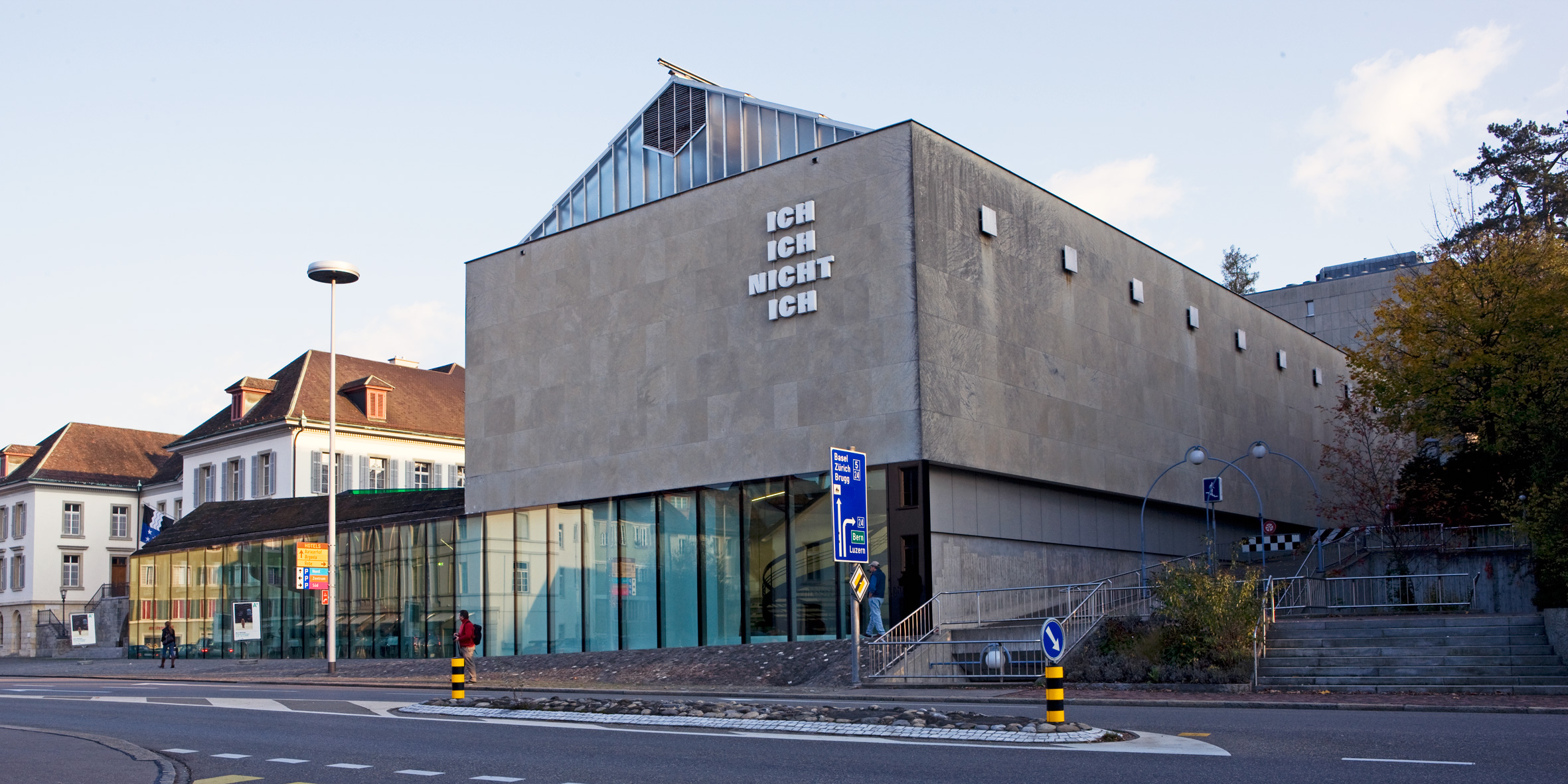
- Established: 1959
- Location: Aargauerplatz 1, Aarau, Canton of Aargau, Switzerland
- Coordinates: 47°23′24″N 8°02′41″E
- Type: Art museum
- Director: Katharina Ammann
- Website: www.aargauerkunsthaus.ch

The Aargauer Kunsthaus (English: Aargau Art House) is a Swiss art museum founded in 1959, and located in Aarau. The museum collection consists of Swiss art from the 18th century to the present day.

== History ==
The Aargauer Kunsthaus traces its origins to the founding of the Aargau Art Association in 1860 as a section of the Swiss Art Association. In 1861, the association organised the first Swiss Art Exhibition in Aarau, held in the former Postremise. Over the following decades, the association pursued the establishment of a permanent museum for Swiss art, which was realised in 1959 with the opening of the Aargauer Kunsthaus in Aarau. In 1962, a formal agreement defined the cooperation between the canton and the association, under which the canton assumed ownership and maintenance of the building, while the association remained responsible for the collection and exhibitions. Subsequent growth of the collection led to an expansion of the museum, completed in 2003.

Since 1 July 2020, art historian Katharina Ammann has served as the director of Aargauer Kunsthaus.

== Collection ==
The Aargauer Kunsthaus holds more than 21,000 works, making it one of the most extensive public collections of Swiss art from the 18th century to the present. Works in the museum art collection include artists such as Alberto Giacometti, Jean Tinguely, Richard Long, and Fischli/Weiss.

Since 2017, the museum has increasingly incorporated digital mediation formats, including augmented reality and video-based projects. In 2024, it collaborated with the Fantoche animation film festival on the exhibition Re-Mix, in which video artists animated selected works from the museum's collection.

== Building ==
The collection is housed in a building constructed between 1956 and 1959 by local architects Loepfe Hänni and Hänngli. In 2003, the museum was expanded with a new building designed by the architecture firm Herzog & de Meuron.

== Exhibitions ==
The Aargauer Kunsthaus hosts an annual flower exhibition in which contemporary florists interpret selected works from the museum's collection. In 2025, the exhibition attracted around 18,000 visitors within six days. In 2026, it set a new attendance record, with 18,706 visitors over the same period.

In 2026, it presented a collection-based exhibition devoted to the Swiss artist Mario Sala, drawing on works from its own holdings as well as additional loans. Later that year, the museum is scheduled to present Künstliche Kreativität, an exhibition organized in collaboration with the Haus der Elektronischen Künste that examines artificial intelligence and human-machine collaboration in contemporary art.

== See also ==
- List of contemporary art museums
- List of museums in Switzerland
- Manor Cultural Prize
- Aargauer Literaturhaus
