= Kunstmuseum St. Gallen =

Swiss art museum

Coordinates: 47.4278°N 9.38158°E

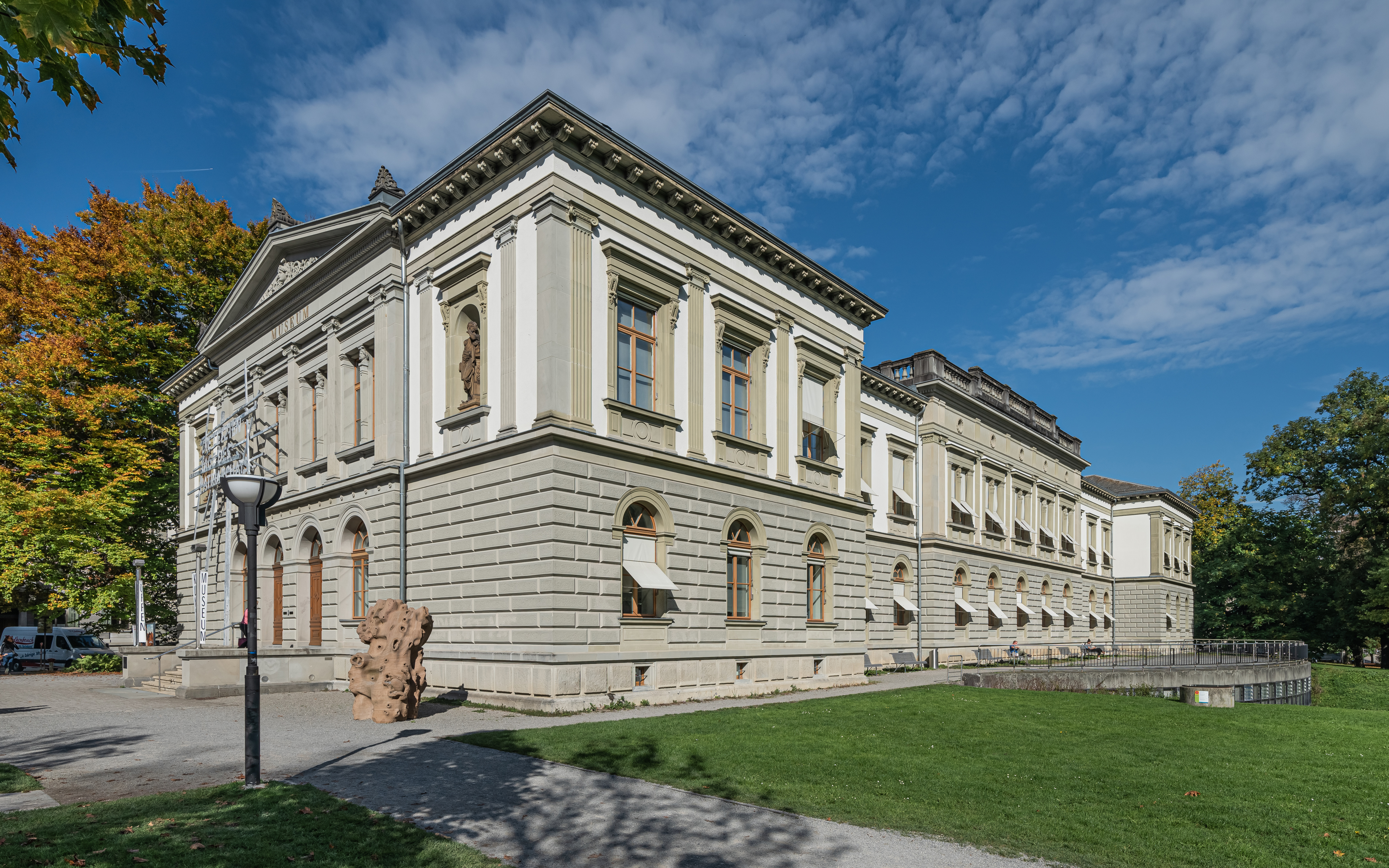
Kunstmuseum St. Gallen, 2022

Kunstmuseum St. Gallen (English: Art Museum St. Gallen), is a Swiss art museum founded in 1877 and located in St. Gallen, Switzerland. The museum holds a collection of paintings and sculptures spanning the late Middle Ages to the present.

== About ==
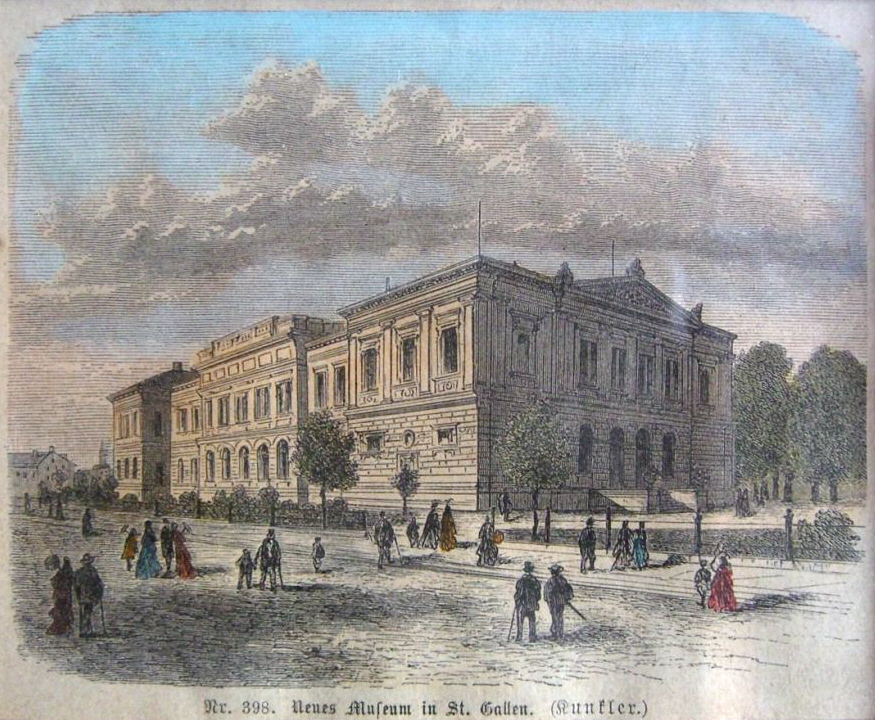
Neues Museum St. Gallen, 19th-century drawing Johann Christoph Kunkler

The St. Gallen Kunstverein (English: St. Gallen Art Association) helped found the museum. Since 2012, the museum is operated by Stiftung Kunstmuseum St. Gallen (English: The Kunstmuseum St. Gallen Foundation). The building for the museum was designed by architect Johann Christoph Kunkler.

The museum's collection comprises approximately 3,000 works, spanning around 500 years of European painting, from early 16th-century altarpieces through Baroque, Realism, Impressionism and modern art. Highlights include works by Gustave Courbet, Camille Corot, Eugène Delacroix, Claude Monet, Alfred Sisley and Camille Pissarro, as well as Swiss artists such as Ferdinand Hodler, Cuno Amiet, and Giovanni and Augusto Giacometti.

Since 1989/1990, the Kunstmuseum St. Gallen has participated in the Manor Cultural Prize, which is awarded every two years for Swiss emerging artists representing the Canton of St. Gallen.

After the relocation of the Natural History Museum, the Kunstmuseum St. Gallen was able to expand its exhibition space and present a representative cross-section of its collection to the public. In 2017, the museum opened the long-term exhibition Endlich! Glanzlichter der Sammlung, which displayed around ten percent of the approximately 3,000 works held by the institution.

== Selected exhibitions ==
In 1989, the museum presented Stickerei-Zeit, an exhibition reflecting on the peak period of the embroidery industry in St. Gallen.

In 2013, it hosted the first solo exhibition in Switzerland by Palestinian-British artist Mona Hatoum.

In 2016, it hosted The Dark Side of the Moon, an exhibition addressing the darker and existential aspects of contemporary and past societies.

In 2018, it presented Spuren, an exhibition by Swiss artist Roman Signer featuring installations, drawings and Super-8 films, partly based on a donation of drawings from the years 1971 to 1987.

== See also ==
- List of museums in Switzerland
