= List of Swiss women artists =

This is a list of women artists who were born in Switzerland or whose artworks are closely associated with that country.

== A ==
- Anna Maria Barbara Abesch (1706–1773), reverse glass painter
- Eva Aeppli (1925–2015), painter, sculptor
- Albertine (born 1967), illustrator, mainly of children's books

== B ==
- Alice Bailly (1872–1938), Cubist painter
- Raffaella Bruzzi, Italian-Swiss contemporary artist
- Marie-Claire Baldenweg (born 1954), contemporary artist
- Maria Cecilia Adelaide Bass (1897–1948), painter
- Ursula Biemann (born 1955), video artist
- Hélène Binet (born 1959), architectural photographer
- Alice Boner (1889–1981), painter, sculptor, historian
- Sonam Dolma Brauen (born 1953), Tibetan-Swiss contemporary painter and sculptor
- Louise Catherine Breslau (1856–1927), German-born Swiss painter, pastelist and printmaker
- Mauren Brodbeck (born 1974), photographer
- Henriette Brossin de Polanska (1878–1954), painter
- Heidi Bucher (1926–1993), sculptor
- Karin Karinna Bühler (born 1974), contemporary visual artist
- Jenny Burckhardt (1849–1935), painter
- Martha Burkhardt (1874–1956), painter and photographer

== C ==
- Miriam Cahn (born 1949), painter
- Claudia Christen (born 1973), designer and photographer
- Aloïse Corbaz (1886–1964), outsider artist
- Louise de Corcelles (1726–1796), amateur artist
- Corinne Cuéllar-Nathan (born 1958), landscape painter
- Martha Cunz (1876–1961), printmaker, lithographer
- Marie-Antoinette Chiarenza (born 1957), member of the artist collective RELAX (chiarenza & hauser & co), contextual artist

== D ==
- Adèle d'Affry (1836–1879), artist and sculptor
- Helen Dahm (1878–1968), expressionist artist
- Silvie Defraoui (born 1935), visual artist
- Dr. Gindi (born 1965), sculptor

== E ==
- Ulla Engeberg Killias (1945–1995), Swedish-born Swiss painter
- Trudy Egender-Wintsch (1902–1985), painter, illustrator

== F ==
- Janika Fabrikant (born 1934), French-born Swiss Surrealist industrial painter
- Valérie Favre (born 1959), painter
- Marie Ferrier-Perregaux (1777–1838), painter
- Sylvie Fleury (born 1961), pop artist
- Annemie Fontana (1925–2002), sculptor, painter
- Pia Fries (born 1955), painter
- Anna Füssli (1749–1772), painter

== G ==
- Babeli Giezendanner (1831–1905), painter
- Alwina Gossauer (1841–1926), photographer
- Henriette Grindat (1923–1986), photographer
- Françoise Grossen (born 1943), textile artist
- Maria Gugelberg von Moos (1836–1918), botanist and floral artist
- Alis Guggenheim (1896–1958), painter, sculptor

== H ==
- Andrea Hasler (born 1975), contemporary artist
- Christine Hiebert (born 1960), artist known for her drawing
- Beatrice Helg (born 1956), photographer
- Maria Herrmann-Kaufmann (1921–2008), painter
- Cornelia Hesse-Honegger (born 1944), scientific painter and illustrator
- Olivia Heussler (born 1957), photographer
- Susette Hirzel (1769–1858), painter
- Britta Huttenlocher (born 1962)
- Heidrun Huwyler (born 1942), German-Swiss Impressionist painter

== K ==
- Angelica Kauffman (1741–1807), Neoclassical painter
- Elisabetta Keller (1891–1969), painter and pastelist
- Emma Kunz (1892–1963), visual artist

== L ==
- Rosa Lachenmeier (born 1959), contemporary artist
- Warja Lavater (1913–2007), designer, illustrator
- Louise-Émilie Leleux-Giraud (1824–1885), painter active in France
- Catherine Leutenegger (born 1983), visual artist
- Henriette L'Hardy (1766–1808), painter
- Verena Loewensberg (1912–1986), painter, graphic designer
- Jeanne Lombard (1865–1945), painter
- Ingeborg Lüscher (born 1936), artist, working with painting, sculpture, photography, installation and video

== M ==
- Ella Maillart (1903–1997), adventurer, travel writer and photographer
- Brigitta Malche (born 1938), painter and installation artist
- Maria Marshall (born 1966), visual artist
- Annemarie von Matt (1905–1967), painter, graphic artist and writer
- Caroline Mezger (1787–1843), Swiss painter, printmaker, and teacher
- Elvezia Michel-Baldini (1887–1963), painter and illustrator
- Pierrette Micheloud (1915–2007), writer and painter
- Mascha Mioni (born 1941), painter and textile artist
- Alina Mnatsakanian (born 1958), visual artist
- Milo Moiré (born 1983), conceptual artist
- Franziska Möllinger (1817–1880), pioneering German-born Swiss photographer
- Karin Muller (born 1965), writer, filmmaker and photographer

== N ==
- Caro Niederer (born 1963), contemporary artist
- Marguerite Naville (1852–1930), painter, illustrator and photographer

== O ==
- Méret Oppenheim (1913–1985), German-born Swiss Surrealist artist
- Armande Oswald (born 1940), painter, scenographer

== P ==
- Leta Peer (1964–2012), painter and photographer
- Sibylle Pasche (born 1976), sculptor
- Valentine Pasche (born 1979), comics artist
- Mai-Thu Perret (born 1976), Swiss artist of Franco-Vietnamese origin
- Anita Porchet (born 1961), Swiss watch enameller

== R ==
- Marthe Rakine (1904–1996), Canadian-Swiss painter
- Clara von Rappard (1857–1912), painter
- Henriette Rath (1772–1856) Portrait artist
- Pipilotti Rist (born 1962), visual artist
- Ottilie Roederstein (1859–1937), German-Swiss painter
- Pamela Rosenkranz (born 1979), contemporary artist
- Annina Ruest (fl. 2000–), contemporary artist, academic

== S ==
- Jeanne-Pernette Schenker-Massot (1761–1828), miniaturist, pastelist and engraver
- Julieta Schildknecht (born 1960), Swiss-Brazilian photographer and journalist
- Erna Schillig (1900–1993), textile artist, mosaic and plaster muralist
- Anka Schmid (born 1961), film director and video artist
- Renée Schwarzenbach-Wille (1883–1959), photographer, diarist
- Annemarie Schwarzenbach (1908–1942), writer, photographer and traveller
- Christine Sefolosha (born 1955), painter
- Sonia Sekula (1918–1963), expressionist artist
- Caroline Sophie Sordet-Boissonnas (1859–1943), painter
- Anita Spinelli (1908–2010), painter, drawer
- Annie Stebler-Hopf (1861–1918), painter
- Monika Steiner (born 1972), Swiss-born American artist and sculptor
- Martha Stettler (1870–1945), painter, engraver
- Marianne Straub (1909–1994), textile designer

== T ==
- Sophie Taeuber-Arp (1889–1943), painter, sculptor, textile designer
- Elisabeth Terroux (1759–1822), painter
- Myriam Thyes (born 1963), Luxembourg-born Swiss media artist
- Miriam Tinguely (born 1950), painter and engraver
- Anna Maria Tobler (1882–1935), painter
- Anne Marie Trechslin (1927–2007), Italian-born Swiss painter, engraver and illustrator
- Natasha Tsakos (fl. 2000–), performance artist
- Lill Tschudi (1911–2004), linocut printmaker

== V ==
- Annie Vallotton (1915–2013), Bible illustrator
- Denise Voïta (1928–2008), painter, lithographer and tapestry designer

== W ==
- Isabelle Waldberg (1911–1990), sculptor
- Anna Waser (1678–1714), painter
- Charlotte Weiss (1870–1961), painter
- Lisa Wenger (1858–1941), painter and children's writer
- Marianne von Werefkin (1860–1938), Russian-Swiss Expressionist painter

== Z ==
- Albertine Zullo (born 1967), children's book illustrator
