= Aia Leu =

Contemporary artist based in Ireland

- Born: 1971 (age 54–55); Formentera, Spain

Aia Leu (born 1971 in Spain) is a contemporary Swiss artist based in Ireland.

== Biography ==
Aia Leu was born in Formentera, Balearic Isles, Spain. She studied figure sketching in Vevey and moved to the town of Kenmare in County Kerry, Ireland in 1989. Her solo exhibition of paintings Spirits was held in Killarney in County Kerry in 2014.

Her aunt is Miriam Tinguely and her grandmother was the Swiss artist Eva Aeppli. Eva was married to Jean Tinguely, and they were friends with Niki de Saint Phalle and Daniel Spoerri. Together, they were part of the avant-garde art scene in Paris in the 1950s and 1960s.

La Table (1965-1967) was a haunting textile installation by Eva Aeppli which featured as part of the ROSC ’71 major international modern art exhibition held at the Royal Dublin Society (RDS) in Dublin, Ireland.
