= Giuseppe Mascarini =

Italian painter (1877–1954)

Giuseppe Mascarini (Bologna, 17 November 1877 - Milan, 3 November 1954) was an Italian painter.

== Biography ==
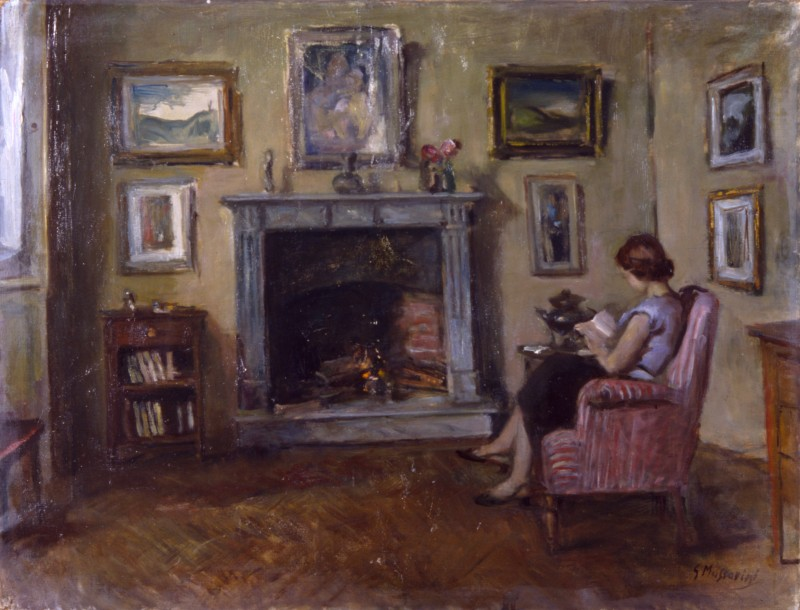
Indoors

He enrolled at the Brera Academy, but deferred it to pursue painting independently. In 1914, he married the Swiss painter Elvezia Michel, who was related to Giovanni Giacometti and Alberto Giacometti.

== Artistic style ==
Mascarini was a part of the late-nineteenth-century Lombard naturalism artistic movement, he mainly focused on Ligurian seascapes, still lifes and the study of the human figure, with a particularly emphasis on the emotional aspects of the mother-child relationship.

== Main exhibitions ==
Mascarini exhibited his works at La Permanente in Milan, the National Exhibition of Fine Arts in 1922 with Carlo Bazzi, the Quadriennale di Roma and at the Biennali di Venezia in 1912 and subsequently in 1950.

== Works in museums and collections ==
Mascarini's works can be found in various public and private collections in Milan. The Gallery of Modern Art owns four paintings: Violetta e Nonna e nipotina, bought for the autumn social exhibitions at Permanente in 1918 and 1935, a Portrait of Mr Carlo Canali (Ritratto del signor Carlo Canali), donated by his widow in 1920 and a Portrait of Mrs Maria Luisa Grubicy (Ritratto della signora Maria Luisa Grubicy), bequeathed by Alberto Grubicy, Vittore Grubicy de Dragon's brother. The Raccolte d'arte dell'Ospedale Maggiore contain four portraits of his benefactors (Camillo Crespi, Giovanna Gargantini dal Verme, Lorenzo Brera and Luisa Vacchelli Rocco). In 1955, one of his paintings (Indoors) was purchased by the art collection of Fondazione Capirlo.

One of his paintings is in the civic collections of the Municipality of Rho.

== Related Articles ==
- Alberto Giacometti
- Carlo Bazzi
- Giovanni Giacometti
