= Hiebert =

Hiebert is a surname. Notable people with the surname include:

- Augie Hiebert (1916–2007), American television executive
- Christine Hiebert (born 1960), Swiss-born American artist known for her drawing
- Cornelius Hiebert (1862–1919), Canadian politician
- Elfrieda "Freddy" Hiebert (born 1948), American educational researcher
- Erwin N. Hiebert (1919–2012), Canadian-American historian of science
- Jake Hiebert (born 1963), Canadian songwriter and musician also known as Big Rude Jake
- Paul Hiebert (1932–2007), American missiologist
- Paul Hiebert (1892–1987), Canadian writer and humorist
- Russ Hiebert (born 1969), Canadian politician
