= List of women Impressionists =

The list of women Impressionists attempts to include women artists who were involved with the Impressionist movement or artists.

The four most well-known women Impressionists - Morisot, Cassatt, Bracquemond, and Gonzalès - emerged as artists at a time when the art world, at least in terms of Paris, was increasingly becoming feminized. 609 works by women were shown in the 1900 Salon, as opposed to 66 by women in the 1800 Salon; women represented 20% of the artists shown in painting and graphic arts between 1818 and 1877, and close to 30% by the end of the 1890s.

Source: Women Artists in Paris 1850-1900

- Anna Ancher, Danish, 1859 -1935
- Harriet Backer, Norwegian, 1845-1932
- Marie Bashkirtseff, née Maria Konstantinovna Bashkirtsena, French, 1858-1884
- Amélie Beaury-Saurel, French, 1848-1924
- Cecilia Beaux, American, 1855-1942
- Anna Bilinska-Bohdanowicz, Polish, 1857-1893
- Marie Bracquemond, French, 1840-1916
- Louise Catherine Breslau, German, 1856-1927
- Lady Elizabeth Butler, née Elizabeth Southerden Thompson, British, 1846-1933
- Mina Carlson-Bredberg, Swedish, 1857-1943
- Mary Cassatt, American, 1844-1926
- Marie Cazin, French, 1844-1924
- Fanny Churberg, Finnish, 1845-1892
- Elin Daneilson-Gambogi, Finnish, 1861-1919
- Julie Delance-Ferugard, French, 1859-1892
- Virginie Demont-Breton, French, 1859-1935
- Elizabeth Jane Gardner Bouguereau, American, 1837-1922
- Eva Gonzalès, French, 1849-1883
- Annie Hopf, Swiss, 1861-1918
- Kitty Kieland, Norwegian, 1843-1914
- Anna Elizabeth Klumpke, American, 1856-1942
- Emma Löwstädt-Chadwick, Swedish, 1855-1932
- Julie Manet, French, 1878-1966
- Paula Modersohn-Becker, German, 1876-1907
- Berthe Morisot, French, 1841-1895
- Asta Nørregaard, Norwegian, 1853-1933
- Elizabeth Nourse, American, 1859-1938
- Hanna Pauli, Swedish, 1864-1940
- Lilla Cabot Perry, American, 1848-1933
- Marie Petiet, French, 1854-1893
- Helene Schjerfbeck, Finnish, 1862-1946
- Mary Shepard Greene Blumenschein, American, 1869-1958
- Marianne Stokes, née Preindlsberger, Austrian, 1855-1927
- Annie Louise Swynnerton, née Robinson, English, 1844-1933
- Ellen Thesleff, Finnish, 1869-1954
