= Valp =

Valp can refer to

- The Swedish name for "puppy"
- The Volvo L-3314 car has the pet name "Valp" in Sweden
- A Swiss comics creator, also known as Valentine Pasche
