= Adam Cooley =

American artist

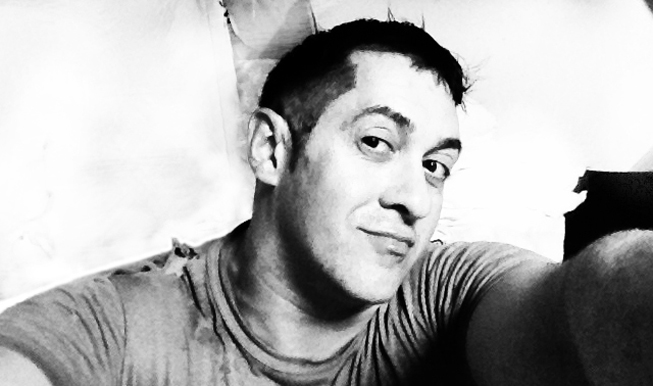
- Self portrait
- Occupations: Painter, sculptor, performance artist

Adam Cooley is an American artist whose works include painting, sculpture, performance art, fashion design, lithography, interior design and film. He currently lives between Osaka, Japan and New York.

== Early life ==
Adam Cooley was born in Rochester, New York. His family moved over 11 times to various parts of New York State. He grew up in a small rural community in Western New York State. The direction of his work was decided early in life and at the age of twenty-two he suffered the first of several heart attacks due to a medical condition which influenced the themes of his artwork and was a major catalyst for the direction of his future works, abundant output and deliberate, focused work-ethic.

== Dominant themes ==
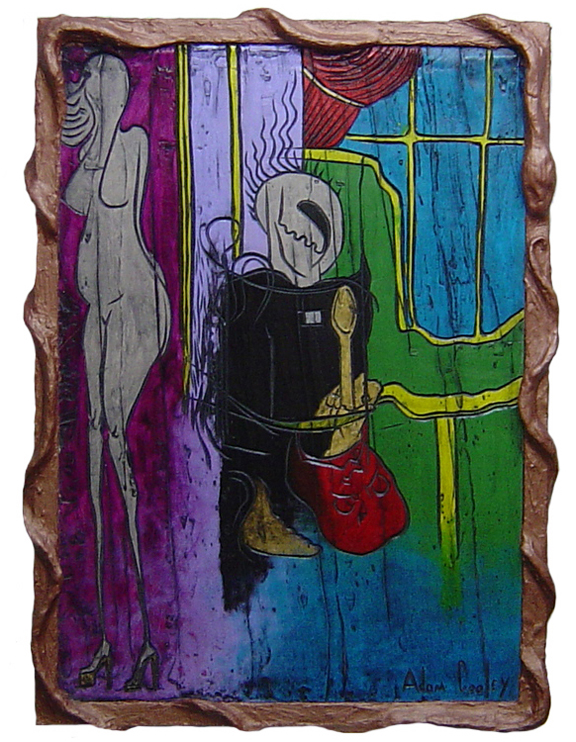
Cooking Dinner for the Little Lady by artist Adam Cooley, Medium: acrylic on wood, Dimensions: 51 cm x 73 cm

Cooley's imagery is often overly fantastic and suggest a strong surrealist influence. It is not only the subject of the paintings that reflect this idea but the techniques and processes used in their development. This can extend to how he exhibits his art. At an exhibition in Kyoto, at the Gallery Maronie, the works themselves were manipulated, touched, and handled by spectators. The resulting change, wear and tear that emerged was intended by the artist as part of the artwork itself. One such work – a painted ball contained in a sandbox that spectators were encouraged to roll, touch, and move – helped in the transformation of the ball by tearing and scratching its painted surface. Other works are laden with metals and gold-leaf, which he transforms using processes such as oxidization and aging to finish his pieces. Often it can take months or even years of aging before the artist considers the works done. It is this transformation of the work itself, a physical object, which mirrors the more fundamental concept, namely transformation of the spirit that is often the subject of his paintings, sculptures and performances.

== Artwork ==
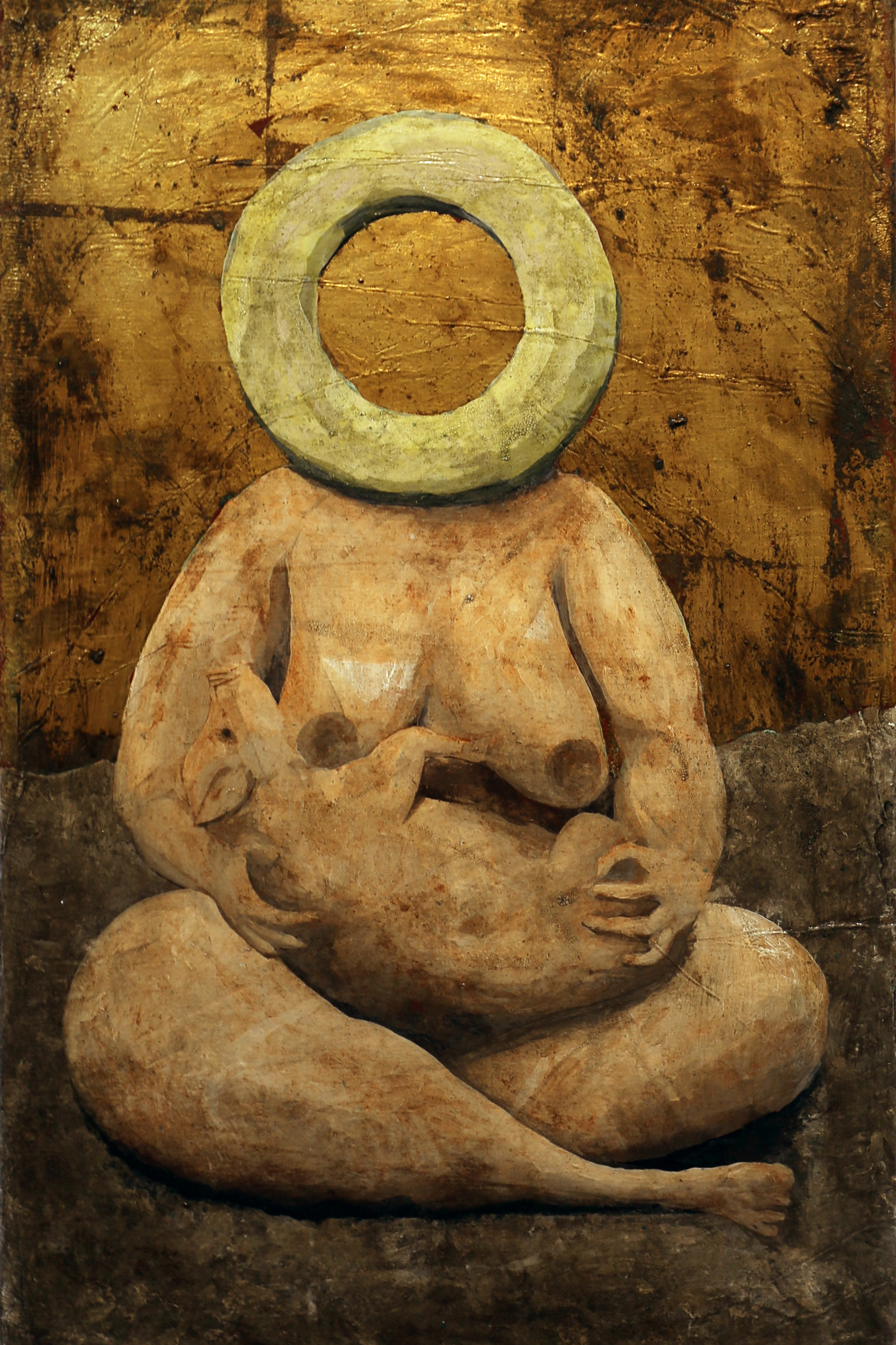
The Suckling Pig by artist Adam Cooley Medium: oil / acrylic on linen canvas, Dimensions: 41 cm x 66 cm

Cooley began exhibiting works – mostly paintings – along with performance art pieces while living in New York. He regularly exhibited works after settling in Asia during the early 1990s.

The artist has created and executed various performance art pieces throughout his career, which have rarely been documented. One exception is a piece titled "Bonsai (2003)" which was documented in a book and corresponding documentary broadcast on public television in fall 2005. Japanland: A Year in Search of Wa by Karin Muller.

Cooley has created in multiple art forms including performance art, interior design, fashion design, painting, sculpture, lithography, printmaking and film. In 2001, selected works – including the painting "Cooking Dinner for the Little Lady" – were exhibited in the Tokyo Metropolitan Museum of Modern Art. The museum has also procured two of his works: "Cockadoodle Surprise" and "The Black Beauty" for their permanent collection. He was the first living foreign artist to have a solo exhibition in the Daimaru and Hankyu Department stores.

In 1998, an exhibit of over 70 works, entitled "Anella", was held at the Maronie Art gallery in Kyoto, Japan. The concept was to exhibit artworks in a barrier free environment in order to broaden the sensual appreciation of art. The works themselves were all highly textured and tactile. They were placed in low positions, allowing spectators to enjoy through touch as well as visual sensation. He approached the Nippon Lighthouse Organization (organization for the blind and visually handicapped) who were excited by the idea and helped to publicize his exhibition. This exhibit allowed visually-impaired spectators to experience otherwise traditional artworks through the sense of touch. The exhibit consequently became highly publicized, with all of the major newspapers – including The Mainichi Newspaper, Asahi Newspaper and The Daily Yomiuri – covering the show.

His works sometimes demonstrate a playful eclecticism, with respect to theme and technique, as shown by an exhibit held in Kyoto in 1999. The exhibit featured amulets constructed of wood and gilded gold-leaf with glass. The "hand-crafted wooden charms" suggested a contrast with modern consumerism and the traditional spirituality that is associated with Japanese animism and the Shinto religion. The small hand-sized amulets were entitled "Kamisamagotchi", as a play on the Japanese word for God: "Kamisama" and the ubiquitous "Tamagotchi" so popular in Japan at the time.

== Appearances in other media ==
Cooley's paintings are featured in the Japanese film "Spit and Honey" (唾と蜜, Tsuba to Hachimitsu; "Spit and Honey"), by film maker Kenji Maki.

== Selected exhibitions ==
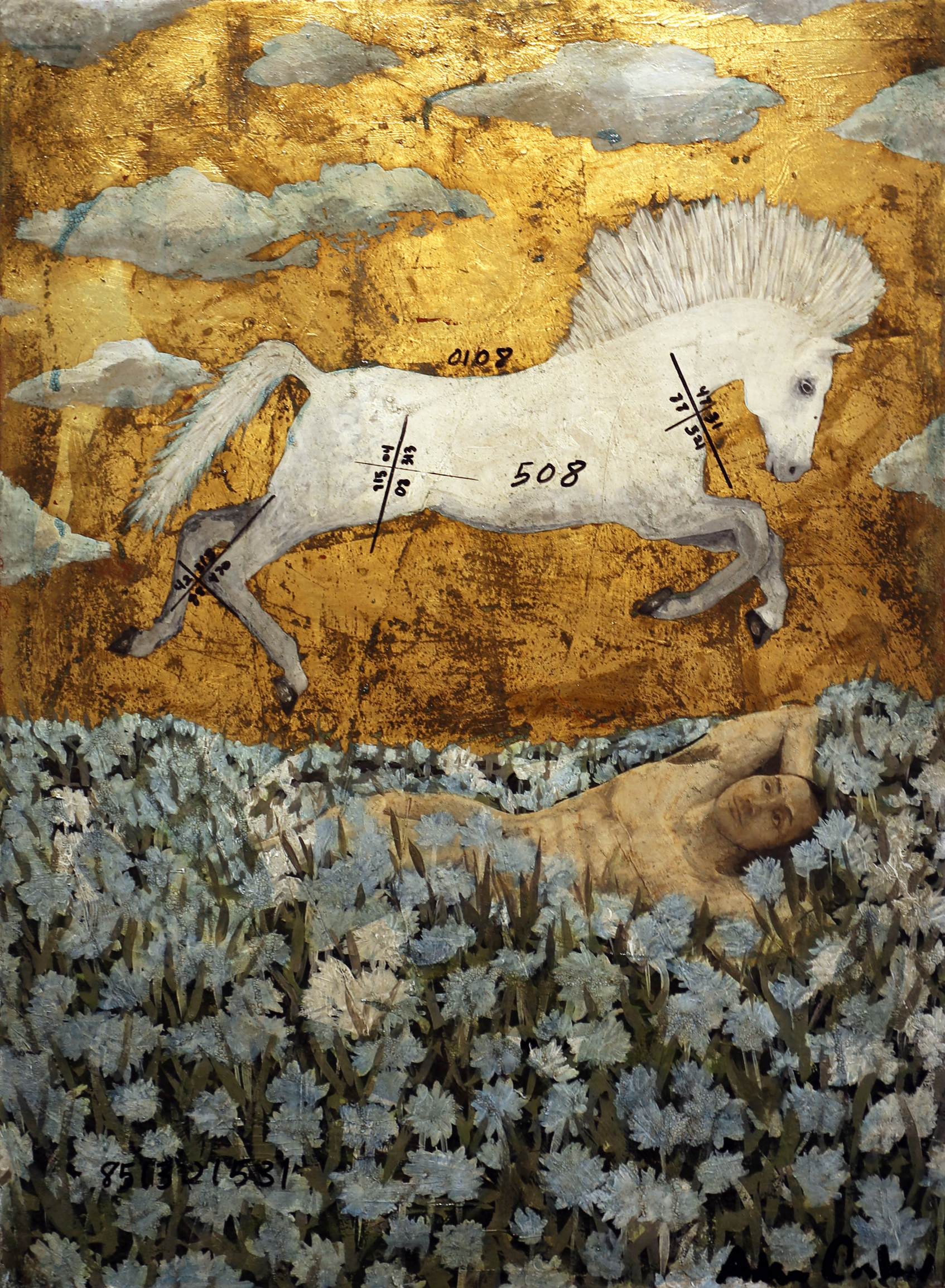
Title: Masa and the Horse Artist: Adam Cooley Medium: oil / acrylic on linen canvas Dimensions: 56 cm x 76 cm

- ECD Christ (1994), The Blue Nile Gallery, Osaka, Japan.
- Anella (1998), Maronie Gallery, Kyoto, Japan.
- Adam Cooley: Introspection (1999), Tokyo Metropolitan Museum of Modern Art, Tokyo, Japan.
- The Golden Woman (2002), The Red Brick Warehouse, Osaka, Japan.
- The Mask (2012), Hankyu Department Store, Osaka, Japan.
- Mechanical Animals (2014), Daimaru Department Store, Kyoto, Japan.
- Sea of Love (2018), Gallery Nao, Roppongi, Tokyo, Japan.
- OIAF Oxford International Art Fair (2018), Oxford City Council, Town Hall, UK.
- Flower of Love (2018), Hankyu Umeda Gallery, Osaka, Japan
- Flower of Passion (2019), Gallery NAO (Nakamura Art Office) Roppongi
- Adam Cooley・我妻 瑩眞 二人展「LOVE × 愛」 (2022), Daimaru Art Gallery, Kyoto, Japan
