= Relaxer (disambiguation) =

A relaxer is a type of lotion or cream that makes hair easier to straighten

Relaxer may also refer to:

- Relaxer (album), a 2017 studio album by Alt-J
- Relaxer (film), a 2018 film directed by Joel Potrykus
- Muscle relaxer, a drug that affects skeletal muscle function and decreases the muscle tone.

== See also ==
- Relax (disambiguation)
- Junior Relaxer, album by King Cobb Steele
