= Relaxation =

Relaxation stands quite generally for a release of tension, a return to equilibrium.

== Science ==
In the sciences, the term is used in the following ways:

- Relaxation (physics), and more in particular:
  - Relaxation (NMR), processes by which nuclear magnetization returns to the equilibrium distribution
  - Dielectric relaxation, the delay in the dielectric constant of a material
  - Vibrational energy relaxation, the process by which molecules in high energy quantum states return to the Maxwell-Boltzmann distribution
  - Chemical relaxation methods, related to temperature jump
  - Relaxation oscillator, a type of electronic oscillator

=== Mathematics ===
- Relaxation (approximation), a technique for transforming hard constraints into easier ones
- Relaxation (iterative method), a technique for the numerical solution of equations
- Relaxation (extension method), a technique for a natural extension in mathematical optimization or variational problems

=== Computer science ===
- Relaxation (computing), the act of substituting alternative program code during linking

=== Psychology, physiology, hypnosis, meditation, and recreation ===
- Relaxation (psychology), the emotional state of low tension
- Relaxation technique, an activity that helps a person to relax

== Ecclesiastical law ==
- Relaxation in person, transfer of a condemned person so that secular authorities execute a death sentence

== See also ==
- Leisure
- Tension (music)
- Relaxation response (disambiguation)
- Relax (disambiguation)
