= Relax =

Relax or RELAX may refer to:

== Music ==
=== Albums ===
- Relax (Das Racist album), 2011
- Relax (KRU album), 2004
- Relax, by Blank & Jones, 2003
- Relax, by Los Piratas, 2003

=== EPs ===
- Relax (EP), or the title track, by Antonia, 2025

=== Songs ===
- "Relax" (Deetah song), 1998
- "Relax" (Frankie Goes to Hollywood song), 1983
- "Relax" (Crystal Waters song), 1995
- "Relax", by Calvin Harris from Ready for the Weekend
- "Relax", by Das Racist, title track from Relax
- "Relax", by Labi Siffre from The Singer and the Song
- "Relax", by Peaches from I Feel Cream
- "Relax", by Superorganism from Superorganism
- "Relax", by The Who from The Who Sell Out

== Film ==
- Relax (film), a Telugu film

== Other uses ==
- Relax (software), a suite of self-improvement software for Atari 8-bit computers
- Roland Z-120 Relax, a German ultralight aircraft design for the 120 kg class
- Regular Language description for XML, or RELAX, a specification for describing XML-based languages
  - RELAX NG
- RELAX (chiarenza & hauser & co), an artist collective

== See also ==
- "Relax, Take It Easy", a 2006 song by Mika
- Relax...It's Just Sex, a 1998 film
- Leisure
- Relaxation (disambiguation)
