= Karin Karinna Bühler =

Swiss visual artist (born 1974)

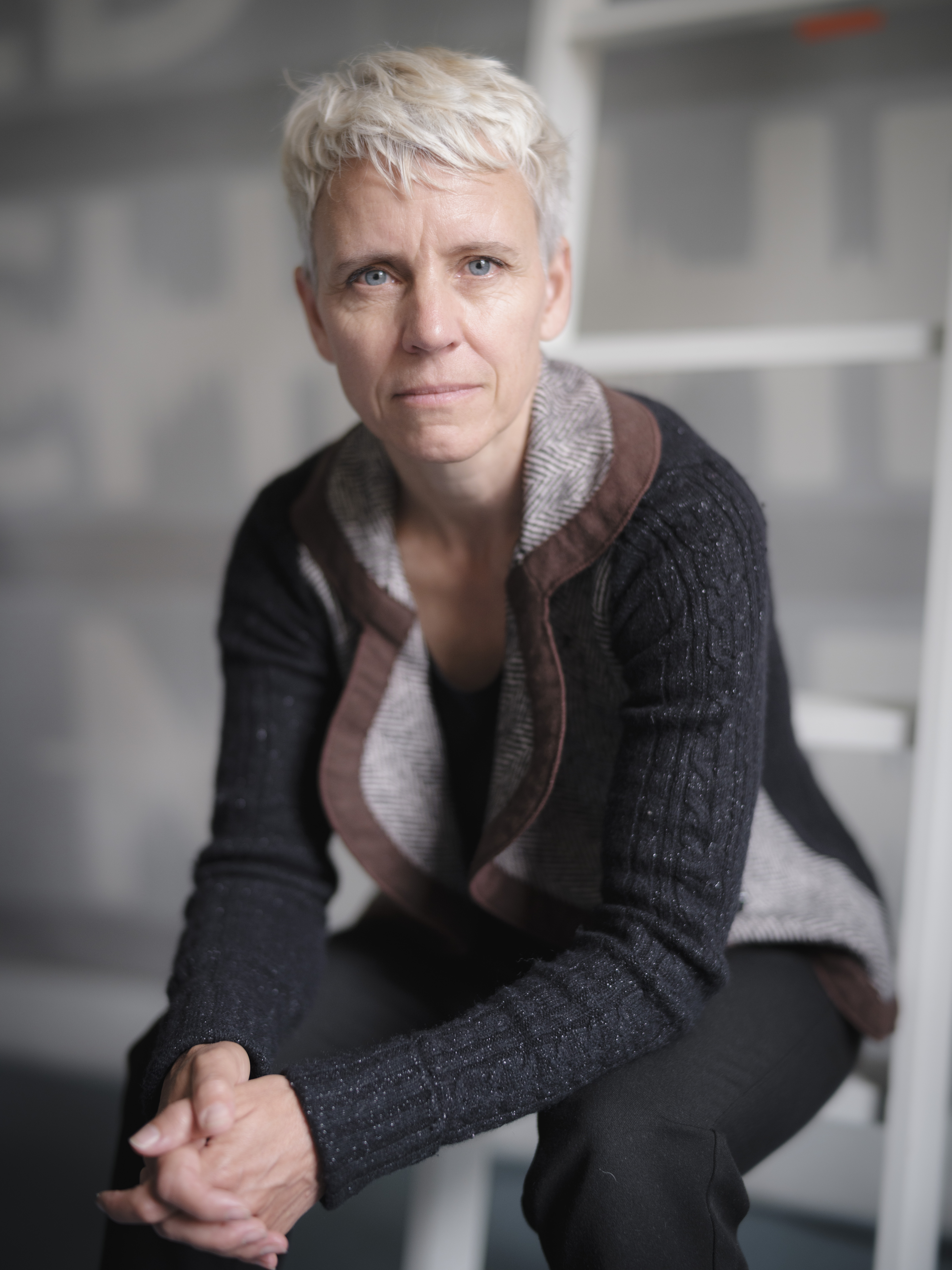
Karin Karinna Bühler (2023)

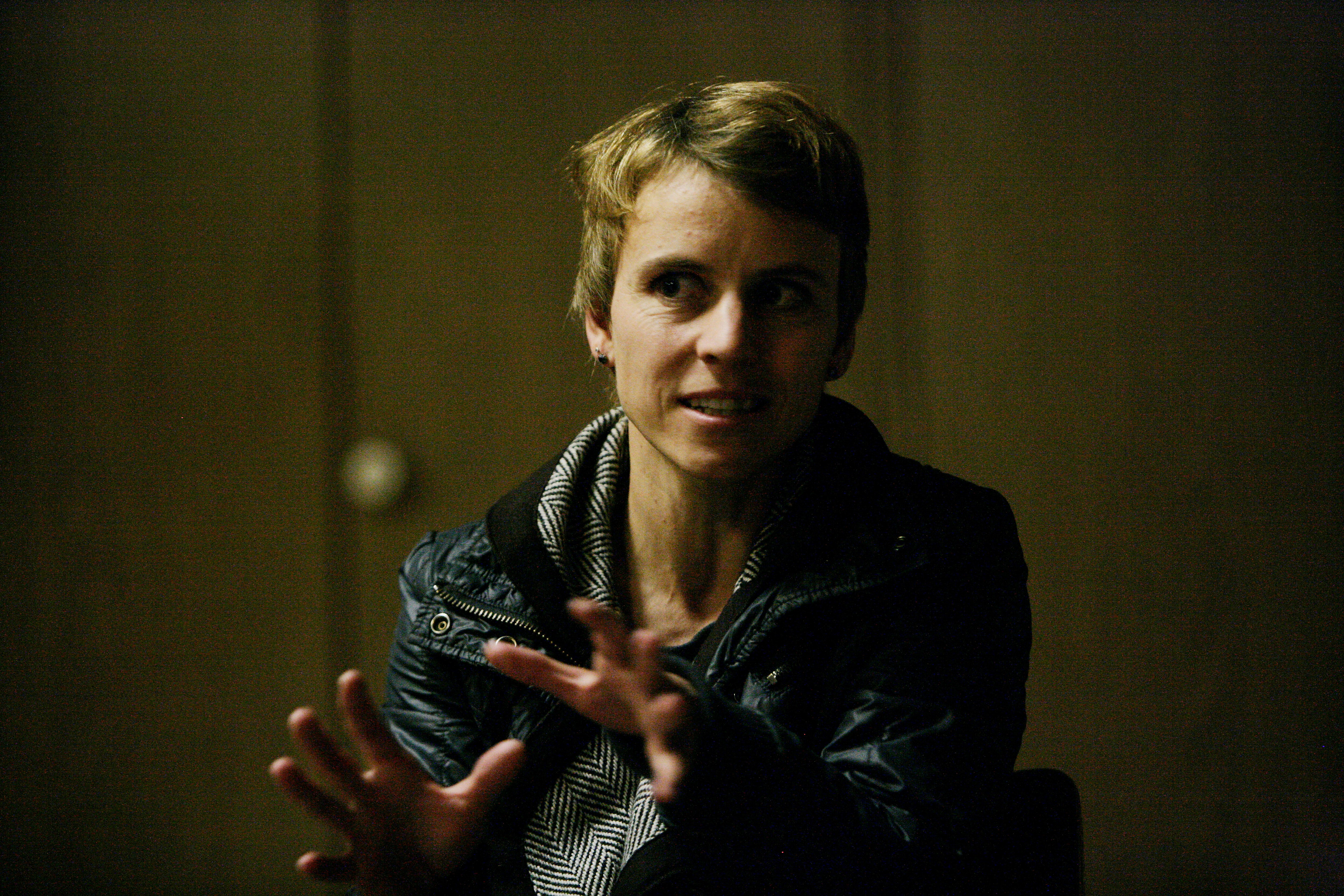
Karin Karinna Bühler (2009)

Karin Karinna Bühler (born June 21, 1974 in Herisau) is a Swiss contemporary artist. She is known for her conceptual and audio art as well as for her site-specific installations.

== Work ==
In her work, Bühler relies on text material, which she combines with memories and experiences of a specific place. In media the artist is called "sculptor of mental space", modelling language and space into something new. This results in expansive multidimensional installations. Through the clear and imposing forms of writing in connection with spaces, the artist opens up a wide field for associations and perceptions for the viewer.

Since 2004, Bühler has exhibited her work at various venues in Switzerland as well as internationally. The artist's works are represented in various collections. The sculpture CAMBIO, which was created as part of the Arte Castasegna project, was included in the collection of the Kunstmuseum St.Gallen and gave its name to the 2020 collection presentation.

In 2021, she received the Artist in Residence Scholarship of the Ausserrhodische Kulturstiftung (Cultural Foundation).

== List of exhibitions ==
Solo exhibitions

- 2005: Ich weiss wo dein Haus wohnt, Projektraum exex, St. Gallen
- 2008: Ein zartes Schaudern, Schaukasten Herisau
- 2010: Meines Erinnerns, dessen ich völlig sicher war, Städtische Ausstellung im Katharinen, St. Gallen [Kunstbulletin]
- 2012: Es wird schon passen, Kubox, Romanshorn
- 2014: Quasi aus dem Nichts, Stiftung Sitterwerk, St. Gallen
- 2017: Manon/Karin Karinna Bühler, Hiltibold, St. Gallen
- 2022: Kabinettstück – Vol. Kirchgasse 8, Kunstmuseum Olten

Group exhibition

- 2004: Frauenaufzug, Zeughaus Teufen (PDF; 1,1 MB)
- 2007: Manual, Kronika, Bytom (Poland)
- 2008: A Town (Not a City), Kunst Halle Sankt Gallen, St. Gallen
- 2009: Urban Kiss, Galerie Kritikù, Prag
- 2009: Heimspiel 09, Kunst Halle Sankt Gallen und Kunstmuseum St. Gallen
- 2009: Free Trade (Swiss Edition), International 3, Manchester
- 2010: Vast Empire, Sic! Raum für Kunst, Luzern
- 2011: IMPROfessionals, Internationale Bodenseekonferenz (IBK), Lindau
- 2011: peer-to-peer, V22, London
- 2011: Garderobe, Binz39, Zürich
- 2012: Over the Rainbow, Kunstmuseum St. Gallen
- 2012: Ein zartes Schaudern – Fragmente der Wirklichkeit, Kunst (Zeug) Haus Rapperswil
- 2013: Video Arte Palazzo Castelmur, Palazzo Castelmur in Coltura bei Stampa
- 2014: Anthroposphere, Nextex St. Gallen
- 2015: Modell Mittelholzer – Der Afrikaflug als Anlass, Kulturraum Kanton St. Gallen
- 2016: Vocabulary, À discrétion, Kulturstiftung Appenzell Ausserrhoden
- 2018: Walk the Line, Zeughaus, Teufen
- 2018: Cambio, Arte Castasegna
- 2019: TEXTUR, Vebikus, Schaffhausen
- 2020: CAMBIO – neu in der Sammlung des Kunstmuseums St. Gallen, Kunstmuseum St. Gallen
- 2020: I ha en Tromm (Appenzeller Dialekt für «Ich habe einen Traum»), APP’N’CELL Now in Kunsthalle Ziegelhütte, Appenzell
- 2020: Welt am Draht, Kunstmuseum St. Gallen
- 2021: Memory – Über die Erinnerung und das Vergessen in ungewöhnlichen Zeiten, Kunstmuseum Olten
- 2021: Heimspiel 2021, Kunstmuseum St. Gallen
- 2022: Going Somewhere – Skulpturen im öffentlichen Raum, Kunstmuseum St. Gallen
- 2022: Florilegium, Zeughaus Teufen

== Recognition and awards ==
- 2006 and 2012: work grant, Ausserrhodische Kulturstiftung (Cultural Foundation)
- 2007: promotion award, city of St. Gallen
- 2018: nomination for the Smithsonian Artist Fellowship
- 2021: artist-in-residence scholarship, Ausserrhodische Kulturstiftung (Cultural Foundation)

== See also ==
- List of Swiss women artists
