= Louise de Corcelles =

Swiss artist (1726–1796)

Louise-Honorée-Françoise Polier de Corcelles, née Louise-Honorée-Françoise de Saussure de Bercher (21 March 1726 – 26 February 1796) was a Swiss amateur artist also known for her correspondence.

Born in Lausanne, Louise Polier de Corcelles was the daughter of David de Saussure, Baron de Bercher, a stockbroker and member of Lausanne's small council, who also served in the French army. Her mother was Angélique Mannlich de Bettens. She was a cousin of the family of Constant de Rebecque. Initially she fell in love with Philippe de Constant, a cousin, but due to local law was unable to marry him. Instead, aged 28, she married Étienne d’Aubonne, who died five years later.

Jonathan Polier de Saint-Germain, sgr de Corcelles-le-Jorat, lieutenant baillival de Lausanne, became her second husband in 1767. The couple wintered in Lausanne, summering at the château de Corcelles-le-Jorat. Polier de Corcelles is noted as a pastellist by Isabelle de Charrière in some of her letters; she is also known for having decorated the private theater of her cousin the Marquis de Langallerie. Her correspondence with Salomon and Catherine de Charrière de Sévery has been published. She was the granddaughter of Georges Mannelich.
