= Brigitta Malche =

Swiss-Austrian artist

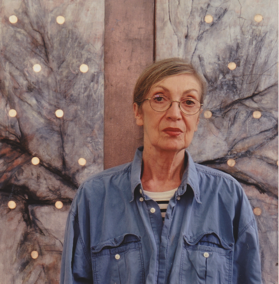
Brigitta Malche in her studio in Zürich, 2001

Brigitta Malche (née Brigitta Maria Cäcilia Mairinger; born 12 March 1938) is a Swiss-Austrian artist with municipal citizenship in Zürich. In addition to paintings on canvas, her work also includes light and sound installations and large scale Public art projects.

== Life, education and career ==
Malche was born in Linz. She studied under Professor Sergius Pauser at the Academy of Fine Arts in Vienna from 1956 to 1963. She also attended Oskar Kokoschka’s master class at the International Summer Academy of Fine Arts in Salzburg in 1957.

During her studies she was awarded five prizes:

- Meisterschulpreis für Malerei [Master School Award for Painting]: 1957
- Goldene Fügermedaille für Malerei [Fueger Gold Medal for Painting]: 1960
- Klassenpreis für Kunsterziehung [Class Award for Art Education]: 1960
- Silberne Fügermedaille [Fueger Silver Medal]: 1962
- Klassenpreis für Kunsterziehung [Class Award for Art Education]: 1963

She graduated in 1963 with a diploma in painting and a qualification to teach visual arts in secondary schools. Until 1970 she worked as a teacher at the Musisch Pädagogisches Gymnasium in Linz and Vienna. Since then she has devoted herself completely to her art.

Malche lives with her husband Yves Schumacher in Zürich.

== Art ==
=== Painting (phases) ===
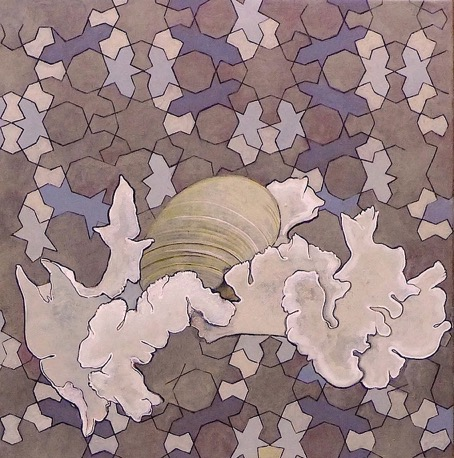
Rose Bubble

Constructivism

Malche's Japan series of paintings, which were made from 1977 onwards, take the appearance of architectural cut-outs and clearly structured façade sections, and testify to how relatively hermetic, constructivist principles can transform a "difficult rectangularity" into a system. The historian Hertha Schober spoke of a "inspired constructivism": "closed surfaces, open rows of bars, blue sky – closed, locked out, open, willingness to communicate [...]."

Meditation

‘Paradigm shift in China: not chinoiseries, not works about China, but instead works from China.’ Malche is inspired, among other things, by Chinese traditional lattice windows covered with rice paper. In her paintings she offsets rectangularity with soft, muted light. In a series of images, she depicts the Chinese oracle Yijing's hexagrams with delicate white tones, to reflect the change and flux of the polar forces’ appearances. This work forms the basis of her later light installations and meditation art.

Nature exploration

This series of paintings (2001) deals with plants and the light that they absorb to make them grow. Graphite and silver leaf are the media used in this series. The reflective qualities of these materials represent the light that is trapped by plants. Malche increasingly focuses on nature and its structures. She presents motifs from various areas of zoology and botany together in a collage-like style. For example, snail shells or sea shells may be interwoven with their molecular structure, or she might develop a crystal’s structure layer by layer. The artist combines patterns from the micro- and macrocosm, abstraction and figuration, movement and geometric patterns.

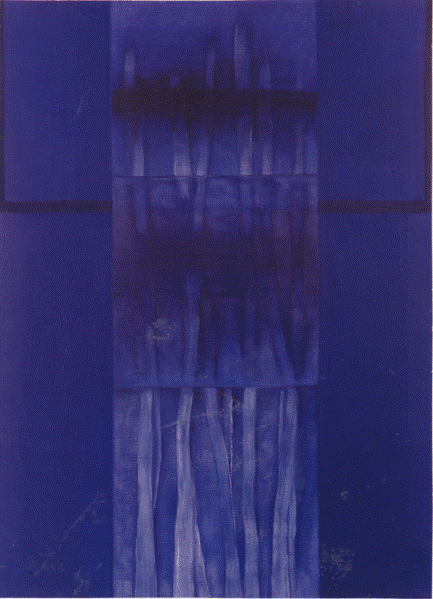
Blaue Orte (Blue Places)

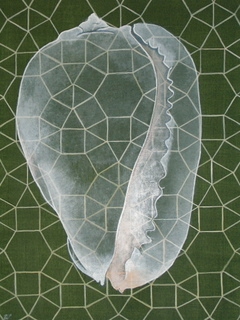
Kaurischnecke (Cowrie)

=== Installations ===
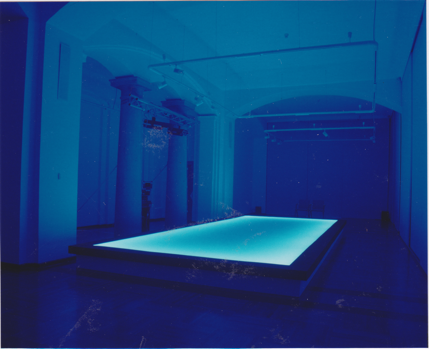
Installation Polarität (Polarity)

One example dates from 1996: Brigitta Malche conceived and curated an exhibition titled Fragile – Handle with Care from the paintings collection of the Akademie der bildenden Künste (Academy of Fine Arts) in Vienna. She invited 14 colleagues to select an old master from the collection and to submit an art work of their own in response to the painting. With her own contribution, she transformed the baroque opulence of Nicola Malinconico's magnificent still life into intangible sensuality by transforming the motif of the watermelon into a cosmically exploding installation of colour and light.

=== Public art projects ===
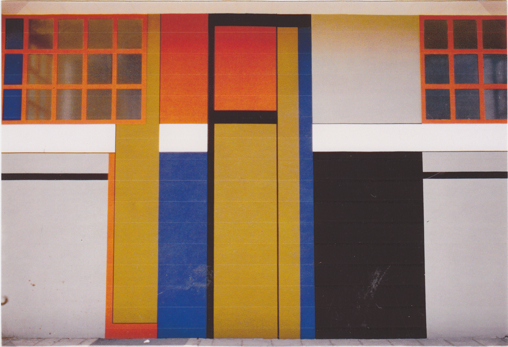
North wing facade of the building complex "Schöpfwerk" in Vienna

- 1978: Am Schöpfwerk superstructure, Vienna. Brigitta Malche created a colour-coded system for this large complex of 1552 apartments by architect Viktor Hufnagl, with her mural which helps the residents find their way around. Work on the design, which was over 1000 square metres, led to her developing the architectural images in her 'Japan Series', created in 1977/79, according to the Viennese art critic Kristian Sotriffer.
- 1980/1981: Bank vault, Swiss National Bank (SNB) in Bern, (with the Atelier 5 architecture group, Bern): approx. 1,000 m² wall painting
- 1983: Kirchgemeindezentrum "St. Clara" (St. Clara parish hall), Basel, Switzerland: mural on floor and stage
- 1985: Schweizerischer Bankverein (now UBS CH): main hall, art installation
- 1987: Höhere technische Bundeslehranstalt Leonding (Higher Federal Technical College Leonding) (HTBL): relief
- 2007: Hospital chapel, Landes-Nervenklinik Wagner Jauregg (Wagner Jauregg Neurological Clinic) in Linz: main hall art installation

== Style and technique ==
During her studies Malche was introduced to the Dutch old master techniques. After creating constructive paintings with acrylic on canvas for her first exhibitions, she later went back to traditional painting techniques with gouache and oil paints. Today she mainly paints with egg tempera she makes herself, to create multi-layered, translucent pictures.

From 1971 to 1980 the artist exhibited in Geneva, Zürich and Vienna. The fact that she encountered the Zürich tradition of concrete art was evident in her first exhibition at the Galerie Palette in Zürich. Her works in the primary colours of red, blue, and yellow were influenced by Piet Mondrian's concept of the "pure relationship of pure lines and colours. Nevertheless, the artist never saw herself as a concrete artist, especially since she emotionalized her angular picture constructions with curves and shadows. The art historian and museum director Erika Billeter said: "If Brigitta Malche’s work is to be categorised in modern art, we must think back to Léger and Mondrian. This is where her roots lie. The constructive basis is infused with abbreviations of different cultures’ architectural components. Columns, volutes and architraves can clearly be seen. Her compositions, however, do not depict architectural details, but reflect them". Richard Paul Lohse, one of the leaders of concrete and constructive art, wrote in the foreword to Malche's catalogue for her exhibition in 1978 at the Schlégl Gallery in Zürich: "A consistent attitude characterizes her current period of rectangular bar grids. Formulations in the tradition of Cubism’s architectural and machine vocabulary still characterized recent images. [...] All the more remarkable is her current intention to abandon the conventional path of diversity of form and to take the more difficult path of right angles, where imagination adds so much while realisation minimises everything".

A two-year stay in Beijing (1980 to 1982), where she was also working as a lecturer at the Beijing Art Academy and was in contact with the Chinese art group Xingxing, was reflected in her art. The constructivism she cultivated gave way to meditative painting, which is characterized, among other things, by sensitive chiaroscuro. Since there are physical limits to light in painting, Malche expanded her work with light and sound installations. Her installation "Vier Elemente" (Four elements) at the Kunsthaus Zürich (Zürich Art Museum), which was part of the Vienna Secession Museum in the late summer of 1991, caused a sensation and brought in a record number of over 17,000 visitors. The installation was also shown to the public at the Museum Xantos Yanos in the Hungarian city of Győr.

For several years now, the artist has been researching the connections between the external appearance of natural objects and the forces hidden within them. In her paintings she abstracts crystals, sea snails, tortoise shells or Butterfly cocoons and connects them with the lives within them. Through a painterly exploration of the connection between surface and depth, she combines the aesthetics of the visible with the biological realities of the invisible, creating a synthesis of concrete references to objects and natural geometric structures.
