= Armande Oswald =

Swiss artist (born 1940)

Armande Oswald (born 1940) is a Swiss artist who has practised drawing, painting, engraving and scenography in the Neuchâtel area for a considerable period.

== Biography ==
Born in Neuchâtel, Switzerland, on 7 July 1940, Oswald is the daughter of the painter Marcel North (1909–1990). After graduating from Geneva's École des arts décoratifs, in the 1960s she initially worked as a scenographer and costume designer at the theatre La Tarentule in St-Aubin. She then turned to engraving, studying under Stanley William Hayter in Paris. Finally, approaching her 50s, she travelled to Italy where she began to paint and has continued to do so ever since.

Commenting on Oswald's work in 1991, Jean-Pierre Golay and Russell Panczenko observe that her large drawings and smaller etchings are not only meticulously presented but exhibit explosive creativity and a powerful sense of meaning. They require the attentive participation of the viewer until the mass of confused strokes emerge into a face or a human figure, culminating in a feeling of positive accomplishment. This also holds for her Au delà des Masques where apparent landscapes reveal faces and vice versa.

In March 2015 in Montalchez, the Cabinet d'expertise Art Anciens held an exhibition of the works of the North family including those of Oswald herself, of her father, Marcel North, his wife, Marie-Claire Bodinier, and Armande's brother, Michel North.

== Published works ==
- Musée d'art et d'histoire, Neuchâtel (1990). Le rêve du peintre: Carlo Baratelli, Jean-Michel Jaquet, Marieke Kern, Armande Oswald : [quatre artistes neuchâtelois]. Musée d'art et d'histoire. ISBN 978-2-88427-030-4.
- Oswald, Armande (1976). Armande Oswald: peintures, dessins, gravures : Galerie 2016, Hauterive. Galerie 2016.
- Sellier, Marie; Oswald, Armande (2013). Le secret de grand-mère. Seuil. ISBN 979-10-235-0070-7.
- Vuillème, Jean-Bernard (2003). Armande Oswald : exposition à la Galerie des Amis des Arts du 18 octobre au 23 novembre 2003 à Neuchâtel. Hauterive: Attinger. ISBN 2-88256-145-8.
