= Karin Muller =

Swiss author, filmmaker and photographer (born 1965)

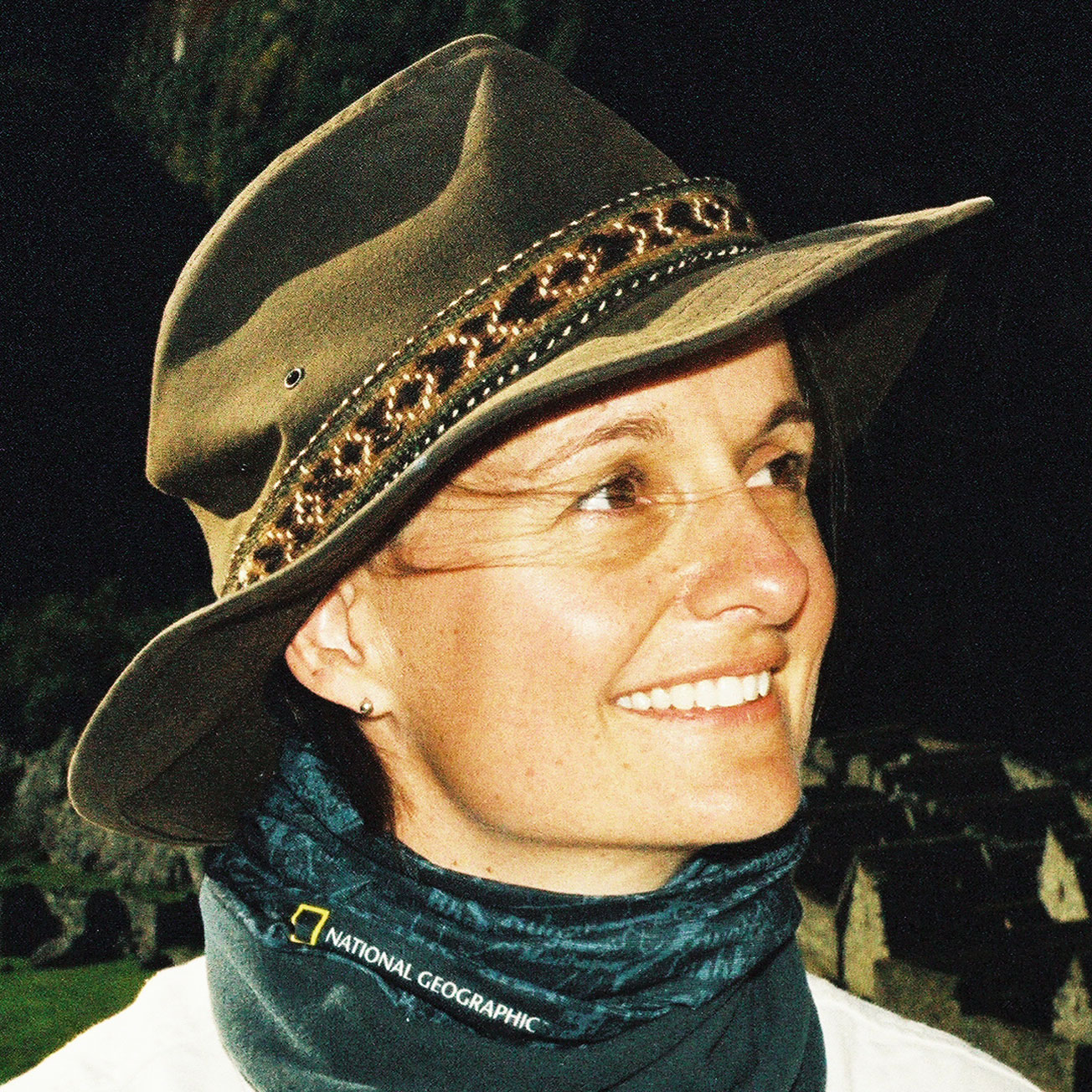
- Born: June 8, 1965 (age 61)
- Education: Williams College (BA, 1987)

Karin Muller (born June 8, 1965) is a Swiss-born author, filmmaker, photographer, and adventurer. She graduated from Williams College in 1987.

== Career ==
Muller has spent the past twenty years traveling alone to remote cultures and conflict zones to bring home stories about people and places. She has published three books (Hitchhiking Vietnam, Along the Inca road, and Japanland), produced numerous international television documentary series, and is a frequent lecturer for the National Geographic Society and universities throughout the United States.

Her first expedition took her to the Ho Chi Minh Trail in Vietnam, which enabled her to produce a PBS television special, Hitchhiking Vietnam, and a companion book by Globe Pequot Press of the same name.

Her second expedition took her to the Inca Road, a 4,000 miles (6,400 km) trek from Quito, Ecuador to Santiago, Chile resulting in a 3-part television series, Along the Inca Road for National Geographic and a book published by the Adventure Press.

Muller's third adventure took her to Japan, where she lived with a pre-Buddhist mountain ascetic cult, joined a samurai-mounted archery team, and completed a 1,300-kilometer pilgrimage around Shikoku. This journey was published in Japanland: A Year in Search of Wa, as both a 4-hour documentary series and book. She took no camera crew or companions, or even much money, and went on foot and emerged profoundly changed and understanding more, but also realized as a "typical" American she could not really become Japanese.

In February 2013 PBS released Muller's documentary, Cuba's Secret Side. Part one, titled Under The Radar, looks at the results of the 1959 Communist Cuban Revolution by examining the day-to-day life of a variety of Cuban citizens.

Part two of Cuba's Secret Side is titled The Truth Revealed. It delves into Cuba's unique religious combination of Catholicism and Santería. This part of the documentary also looks at spear fisherman and their home-made fishing tackle. The second part of the series ends with the examination of a large festival in the town of [?]. Light displays, fireworks and a float parade inspire both competition and cooperation in the local citizens.

Filmed over the course of three months, and without the supervision or permission of the Cuban government, Muller was detained by Cuban authorities over 12 times. The resulting documentary strives to be even-handed, documenting both the successes and failures of the Cuban government. Most remarkably, it details a Cuban humanitarian crisis that happened in the early 1990s only 90 miles (140 km) from the shores of the United States.

In March, 2014, PBS released Muller's next documentary, Sudan's Secret Side., documenting Muller's three-three month journey alone through Chad and Sudan. Muller explored the thriving Sudanese refugee camps, embedded with rebels and government soldiers, and filmed stories of nomadic goat herders and sultan's wedding ceremonies.

In May, 2016, Muller's current documentary, Egypt Beyond the Pyramids will premiere nationwide on public television. Muller spent 9 weeks in Egypt, living with Cairo's garbage collectors, Nile fishermen, and Bedouin nomads. She spent weeks in Tahrir Square covering the Morsi revolution, only to be severely injured by a mob in a remote village in the Nile Delta and flown back to the States for emergency surgery.

Muller lives in Ventura, California.

== Non-profit activities ==
Muller has founded an educational organization named Take 2: The Student's Point of View whose mission is to help students develop global citizenship and leadership skills. Muller provides the raw footage used to create her international documentary series - along with comprehensive curricula - to schools throughout the USA and Canada. Students are encouraged to use the materials to create documentaries or short films and in the process, develop deeply personal connections with the local people whose stories they are telling. The first projects have involved footage from Sudan, Chad, and Cuba; 60 hours of footage were provided to schools, and a number of documentary programs have been completed. Approximately 180 schools have joined the project thus far. In-depth footage is available on a variety of topic, including Cuba, North Africa, and the Environment.

== Filmography ==
- 2017: (Ongoing) Our Human Planet on YouTube
- 2016: Egypt Beyond the Pyramids: 2-hour documentary television series for public television (USA) and PBS Distribution (internationally)
- 2014: Sudan's Secret Side: 2-hour documentary television series for public television (USA) and PBS Distribution (internationally)
- 2013: Cuba's Secret Side: 2-hour documentary television series for public television (USA) and PBS Distribution (internationally)
- 2006: Japanland: 4-hour public television series (filmed, written, edited, narrated, and produced by Karin Muller)
- 2001: Along the Inca Road: 3-part TV Mini-Series documentary for National Geographic (filmed, written, narrated, and produced by Karin Muller)
- 1997: Hitchhiking Vietnam: 1-hour PBS special (filmed, written, narrated, and produced by Karin Muller)
