= Rosc (art exhibition series) =

Art exhibition in Dublin, Ireland

- Duration: 1967-1988
- Location: Dublin, Ireland

Rosc

Rosc was a series of international modern art exhibitions held in Dublin, Ireland approximately every 4 years between 1967 and 1988.

== History ==
The term rosc ([ɾˠɔsˠk] ROSK) is from the Old Irish for a short poem, but for the art exhibitions is interpreted as "the poetry of vision". Architect Michael Scott started the project, and served as the chairman of the board until 1980. It was also championed by Taoiseach Charles Haughey, who served as Honorary President and Vice-President of Rosc. Rosc is considered "pivotal" and "seismic" in the history of Irish art and was the first type of exhibition to place art of international significance in Ireland, long before there was a museum of modern art on the island. Rosc drew crowds, however, the exhibitions, from beginning to end, were also known for their controversies.

The premiere edition was held in 1967. The Department of Education permitted all Irish schools to take time to visit the show; this innovative policy was continued through all the Rosc exhibitions.

In 2017 the Irish Museum of Modern Art, with NIVAL, held a survey exhibition, titled Rosc 50, that presented numerous archival materials recounting the history and significance of Rosc.

== Exhibitions ==
=== Rosc '67 ===
Rosc '67 featured a juried exhibition of 150 works from 50 artists presented side-by-side Irish antiquities at the Royal Dublin Society and the National Museum. Jim Dine, Pablo Picasso, and Roy Lichtenstein were some of the contemporary artists exhibited, although no Irish artists were included in Rosc '67. Brendan Gill of The New Yorker wrote that "Rosc is one of the boldest and most illuminating international exhibitions of modern art ever held... the new and the old salute each other over the centuries... Dublin has provided the ideal setting for their astonishing encounter."

=== Rosc '71 ===
The exhibition was held in the Royal Dublin Society and included Viking art alongside modern works of art. "The centrepiece of the main show [was] a steel sculpture by Alexander Calder from Philadelphia." It also included a textile installation by Swiss artist Eva Aeppli, titled La Table.

=== Rosc '77 ===
The Hugh Lane Gallery exhibited recent works produced in the previous five years and the National Museum of Ireland exhibited historical works for Rosc '77. German painter Gerhard Richter exhibited works.

=== Rosc '80 ===
Rosc '80 was held in the School of Architecture University College Dublin at Earlsfort Terrace, and National Gallery of Ireland. Artists included Marina Abramovic, Ulay, Nam June Paik, Barry Flannagan, Carl Andre, Robert Ballagh, Sol LeWitt, Patrick Scott, and numerous others. This edition featured the first ever performance of Rest Energy by Marina Abramović, "which involved Ulay holding a steel arrow pointed directly at Abramovic’s heart for four minutes." A replica of the Martello Tower that James Joyce lived in was made with 5,000 loaves of bread by Argentinian conceptual artist Marta Minujín.

=== Rosc '84 ===
The newly restored Guinness Hop Store housed the exhibition for the first time. The location was lauded by art critic Aidan Dunne, who suggested it should be a permanent venue. Ellsworth Kelly, George Baselitz, Anselm Kiefer, Sigmar Polke, Gilbert and George, Joseph Beuys, Richard Serra, Anne Madden, Deborah Brown, Eilis O’Connell, and Julian Schnabel were notable among the exhibiting artists.

=== Rosc '88 ===
Rosc '88 was held again at the Guinness Hop Store, and at the Royal Hospital Kilmainham (preceding the opening of Irish Museum of Modern Art in the same building by three years).

== Controversy ==
The absence of any Irish artists in Rosc '67 and Rosc '71 was criticised. There was ongoing "agitation" to include Irish artists throughout Rosc's history, as well as more broadly about representation of Irish art.

The treatment and representation of women is considered a major shortcoming of the exhibitions. "Only four women were represented in ROSC 1967; five in ROSC 1971; none at all in 1977; and six in 1980. Irish women artists did not make it into ROSC until 1984."

Eimear O'Conner in The Irish Times writes that "the exhibitions ran with an ongoing [financial] deficit from the outset" and that persistent problems with financing pitted local artists against the expenses involved of shipping work in from international artists.

Ancient Irish monuments that were moved for the first Rosc caused some controversy. In 2017 Irish artist Sean Lynch exhibited work at the Douglas Hyde Gallery about the relocation and presentation of the Tau Cross of Kilnaboy in Rosc '67.

== Bibliography ==
- Shortt, Peter. The poetry of vision : the ROSC art exhibitions 1967-1988. Newbridge, County Kildare: Irish Academic Press, 2016. ISBN 9781911024293
- Rosc '84 : the poetry of vision. Dublin: Rosc, 1984
- Rosc '71 : the poetry of vision. Dublin: Trinity College, 1971. ISBN 9780903547048
