= Sibylle Pasche =

Swiss artist and sculptor (born 1976)

- Born: 24 August 1976 (age 50); Lucerne
- Website: sibyllepasche.ch

Sibylle Pasche (born 24 August 1976 in Lucerne) is a Swiss artist and sculptor. She lives and works in Zurich (Switzerland), in Carrara (Italy) and the US. From 1996 to 2000, Pasche studied sculpture at the Academy of Fine Arts of Carrara and graduated with the thesis Women – Female Sculptors: The female Sculptor in the History of Art. From 1999 to 2002, she taught at the Liceo Artistico in Zurich.

== Works ==
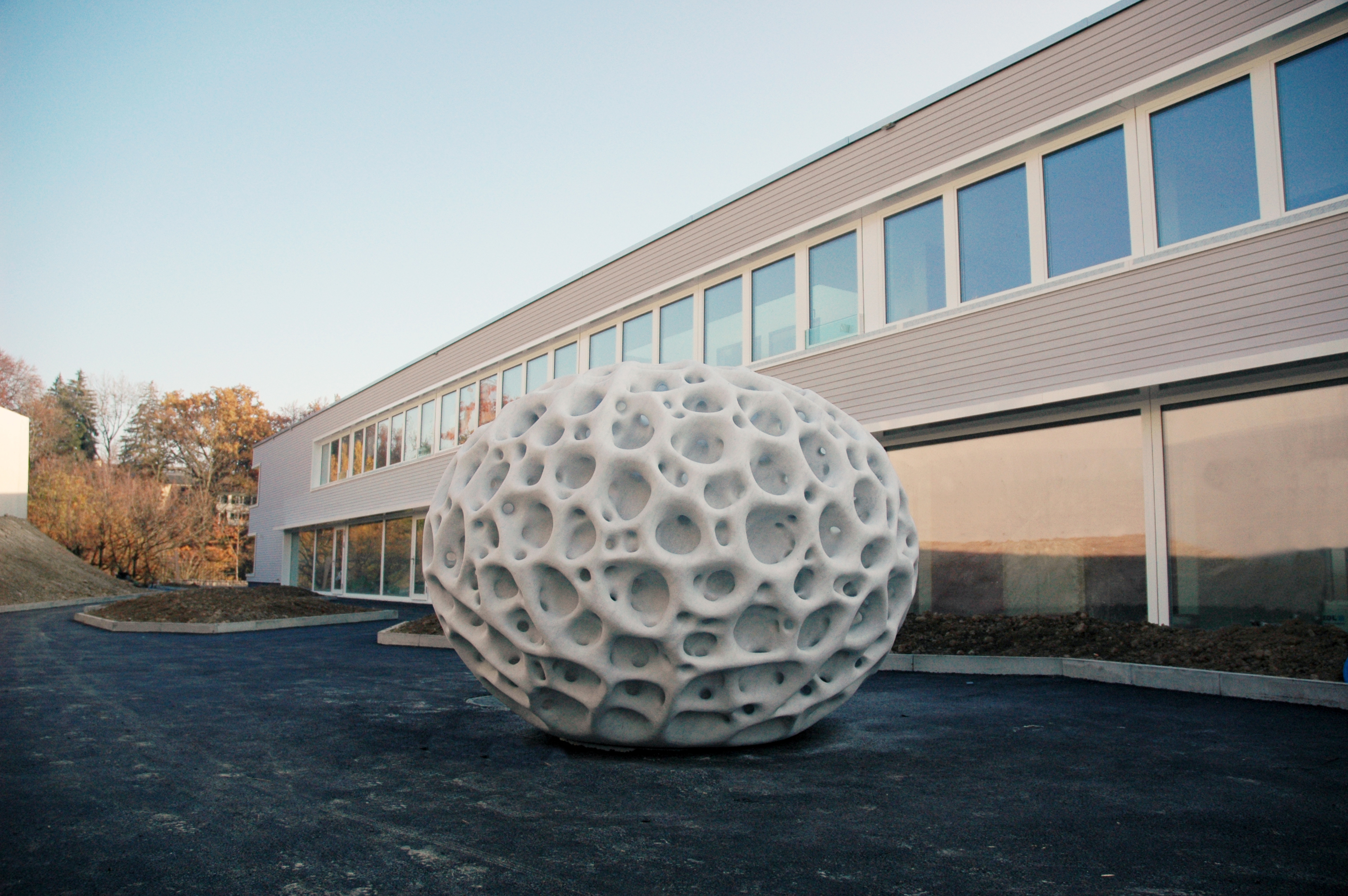
Traces of Time, Meilen/Zurich, 2011

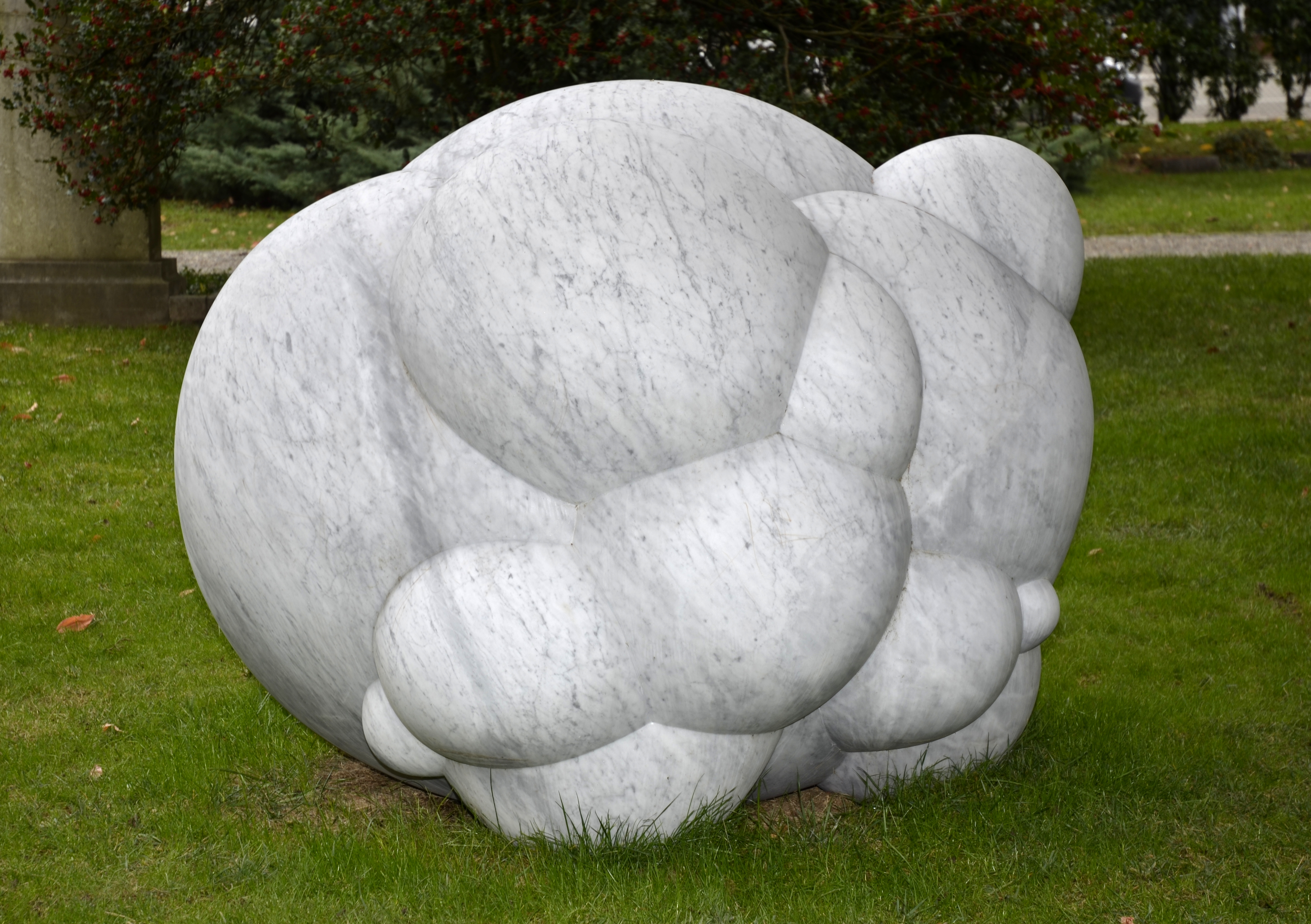
Nascita, sculpture by Sybille Pasche, Kings Cemetery, Geneva.

Sibylle Pasche is known for her large-scale outdoor sculptures. She mostly works with stone (Carrara marble, travertine, black Belgian marble). The processes of nature and the poetry of simple shapes in daily life inspire Pasche. She works with well-known structures and shapes, which she develops further according to her own rules of rhythm and proportion. Her objects, weighing several tons, resemble grounded boulders. The choice of the material, its durability and the corresponding notion of longevity has a force that runs counter to the contemporary Zeitgeist of today's fast-paced world. Pasche prefers esthetics to provocation. Traces of time (2011) is a representative piece of Pasche's focal preoccupations of carving the inside.

Her drawings and paintings can be compared to diary entries complementing her work in stone. Her diaphanous, poetic evocations of natural phenomena investigate both the micro and the macrocosm. As intimated in the series' titles – Cells and Stars, New York (2008/09) and Stars and Snow, Engadine (2010) – her drawings join the fragile and delicate to the cosmic.

== Exhibitions (selection) ==
- 2018/15: 6th/7th Swiss Triennial Sculpture Exhibition, Bad Ragaz (CH) and Vaduz (FL)
- 2016: Open End. Cimetière des Rois, Genève (CH)
- 2016: On form. Sculpture Biennal, Asthall Manor, Oxfordshire (UK)
- 2015: Imago Mundi. Luciano Benetton Collection, Fondazione Cini, Venezia (IT)
- 2014: Insel Mainau, BEGE Galerien, Ulm (DE)
- 2013: Espace d‘une Sculpture, Nyon (VD), visarte.vaud
- 2012: Mana Contemporary, Jersey City (US)
- 2012: 5th Swiss Triennial Sculpture Exhibition, Bad Ragaz (CH) and Vaduz (FL)
- 2010: Cass Sculpture Foundation, Goodwood, West Sussex (GB)
- 2010: Draw. Museo de la Ciudad de Mexico, Mexico City
- 2010: Yorkshire Sculpture Park, Wakefield, West Yorkshire (GB)
- 2008: Cynthia Reeves Gallery, New York
- 2008: Genius Loci. Island Palmaria/Porto Venere (IT)
- 2008: Voluminous Carvings. Seeanlage Meilen/Zurich (CH)
- 2006: XII International Sculpture Biennale, Carrara (IT)
- 2006: Stiftung SkulptUrschweiz, Ennetbürgen/Luzern (CH)
- 2005: Künstlerhaus am Lenbachplatz, Munich (DE)

== Public commissions and collections (selection) ==
- 2015-18: Coral Forest/Secrets of the Sea. Giralda Avenue, Coral Gables/Miami (US)
- 2014-16: Rising Stars. ONE PARK Taipei XinYi Residency Towers, Taipei Taiwan
- 2016: Imago Mundi, Luciano Benetton Collection, Venezia (IT)
- 2014: Aman Resorts, Amanzoe's, Porto Heli, Greece
- 2013: Village Residency, Taipei, Taiwan
- 2012: DeVaulx Collection, North Salem, NY (US)
- 2011: Traces of Time. AZ Platten, Meilen/Zurich (CH)
- 2011: Islands of Stories. Nanshing High School of Chiayi, Taiwan
- 2010: Christel DeHaan Collection, Indianapolis, IN (US)
- 2009: Dartmouth-Hitchcock Medical Center, Lebanon (US)
- 2009: Art Collection Canton Zurich (ZH)
- 2008: Gioco d'Acque II. Seeanlage Meilen/Zurich (CH)
- 2006: Smiling Stars. Daegu Bank Headquarters, Daegu, South Korea
- 2005: Casoria International Contemporary Art Museum, Naples (IT)
- 2005: Mulinelli. Historical Centre Lenzburg (CH)
- 2005: Historical Centre Wilhelmshaven (DE)
- 2002: Sculpture Museum, Teulada, Sardinia (IT)
- 2002: Sculpture Park R. Ciulli, Monticiano, Siena (IT)
- 1998: Esplanade, Piazza Paradiso, Marina di Carrara (IT)

== Literature ==
- Sibylle Pasche: Sibylle Pasche - ONE PARK Taipei, Rising Stars. Meilen 2017.
- Sibylle Pasche: Traces of Time and Spaces. Meilen 2012, ISBN 978-3-033-03410-5.
- Sibylle Pasche: Voluminous Carvings. Meilen 2008, ISBN 978-3-03-301550-0.
- Sibylle Pasche: Poetry in Stone. Meilen 2005, ISBN 978-3-03-300581-5.
