= Rosa Lachenmeier =

Swiss contemporary artist

Rosa Lachenmeier (born March 13, 1959) is a Swiss painter and photographer whose work has been widely exhibited. She lives and works in Birsfelden near Basel.

== Life ==
Growing up in Basel, she came into contact with art at an early age (Museums in Basel, Art Basel). During college, she took drawing classes at the Schule für Gestaltung Basel (Basel School of Design). From 1979 to 1983 she studied at the University of Art and Design (Hochschule für Gestaltung und Kunst Basel) in Basel. In addition to her main studies, she attended lectures on film history, which she completed with the exhibition Architektur für die Nacht – Kino-Architektur 1990 in the Swiss Architecture Museum. From 1985 to 2018 she taught as a lecturer at the Schule für Gestaltung Basel. Since 1985 she has participated as a visual artist in exhibitions and art fairs. From 1993 regular stays and exhibitions in Amsterdam.

== Work ==
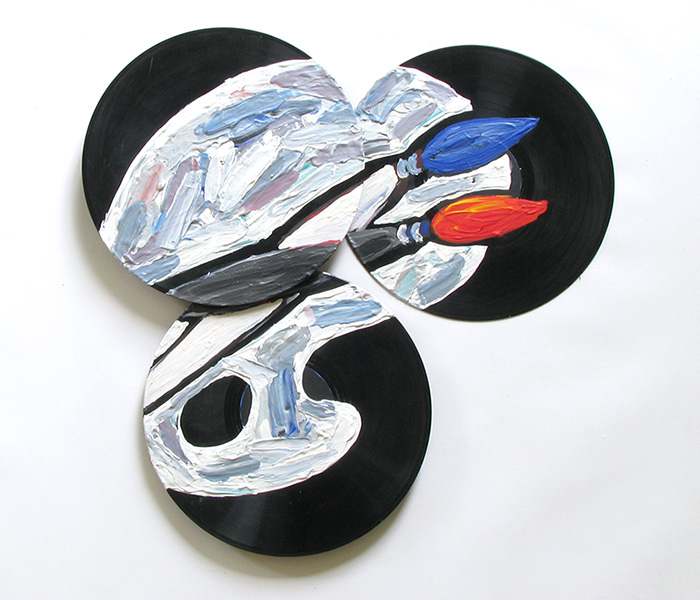
Rosa Lachenmeier: Painter's palette, acrylic on vinyl records, 1985.

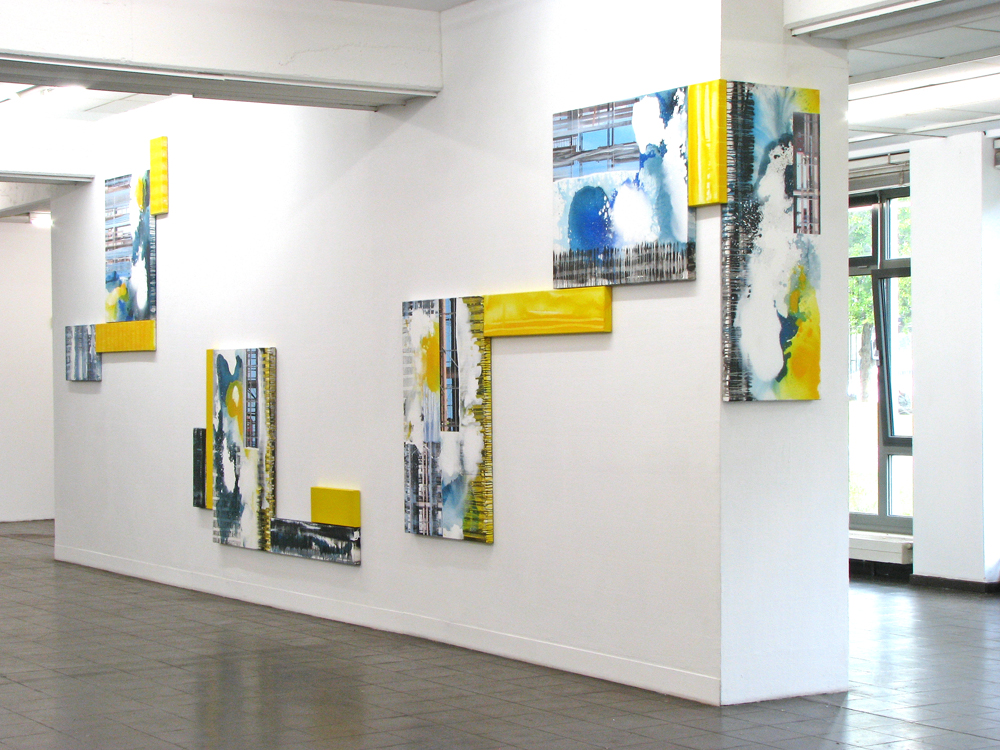
Rosa Lachenmeier: Modular Painting, exhibition space Stapelhaus Cologne, 2011.

In her art work, Rosa Lachenmeier mainly combines painting and photography, setting new accents in the fields of collage. Immediately after her studies, she explored the possibilities of using everyday objects such as vinyl records, plates or shirts as image carrier for her paintings. With her screen objects in the late 1980s, she reflected on media conditions of our time and with the focus on a global view on the earth she asked questions about our constantly changing perception. In the 1990s, she devoted herself to the artist's book as the bearer of an artistic concept, sometimes as a dialogue of word and image, sometimes as a visual sequence of pictorial metamorphoses. These artist's books are distributed by Printed Matter, Inc. in New York and Boekie Woekie in Amsterdam, both artist-operated and artist-specialized stores.

Rosa Lachenmeier became known for her architecture-related painting, which she summarizes under the title Modular Painting. In doing so, she arranges groups of paintings of different formats over and over again, depending on the architectural circumstances. Another focus is on groups of works dedicated to individual cities. On her forays, she captures her impressions with the camera at different times of day and night from different perspectives, so that there are always new perspectives. This results in condensed, cinematic compositions of photography and painting.

== Exhibitions ==
=== Special Location ===
In the Special Location series, Rosa Lachenmeier shows her works in exceptional locations such as the interior of a bridge in Cologne (Subkulinaria, 2008) or in the historic ship named Willi (since 2015).

=== Selection of exhibitions ===
Regular solo and group exhibitions in the gallery AdK, Actuele Kunst in Amsterdam since 1998 and in the gallery Mäder, Basel from 2001 until the closing of the gallery 2017.

- 2020: Kunst-Stoff Plastik, Hans Erni Museum, Lucerne
- 2019: Hidden Paradise, Galerie Sarasin Art, Basel
- 2018: Stadtlichter, Museum Strom und Leben, Recklinghausen
- 2017: Citylife, Kunstverein, Speyer
- 2016: Architektonische Impressionen, Haus der Modernen Kunst, Staufen
- 2013: Streifzüge durch die Welten der Collage, Kunstmuseum Ahlen und MARTa Herford
- 2013: Museum in der Lände, Kressbronn am Bodensee
- 2011: Dreiländermuseum, Lörrach, exhibition space Stapelhaus, Cologne
- 2010: Birsfelder Museum, Birsfelden
- 2008: Art Karlsruhe, Galerie Mäder, Karlsruhe
- 2007: Kunsthalle Palazzo, Liestal
- 2005: Galerie Epikur, Wuppertal
- 2004: Art Frankfurt, Galerie Mäder, Frankfurt
- 1994: Multiple World, The Atlanta College of Art Gallery, Atlanta

== Publications ==
=== Catalogs ===
- Rosa Lachenmeier, Ausstellungen–Exhibitions 1985–2019, Basel 2019.
- Alexander Sarasin: Rosa Lachenmeier / Martin Oeggerli, Hidden Paradise. Sarasin Art, 2019 Basel, ISBN 978-3-9524956-1-2.
- Maria Leitmeyer, Klaus Fresenius: Rosa Lachenmeier, Stadtleben – Citylife, Hrsg. Kunstverein Speyer, Speyer 2017.
- Viola Hildebrand-Schat, Erhard Metz: Bridges – Brücken, Rosa Lachenmeier, Special Location, Kunst im Schiff Willi, Weseler Werft, Frankfurt am Main 2016.
- Nana Badenberg, Roswitha Frey: Magic – Rosa Lachenmeier, Kunst im Schiff Willi, Basler Rheinhafen, August 2015. Basel 2015.
- Heinz Stahlhut, Patrick Marcolli: Rosa Lachenmeier ...and then we take Berlin. Galerie Mäder, Basel 2014, ISBN 978-3-906172-30-9.
- Susanne Buckesfeld: Rosa Lachenmeier – Anarchie und System. Galerie Mäder, Basel 2009, ISBN 978-3-905483-72-7.
- Hans-Joachim Müller: Rosa Lachenmeier – Stadt–Licht. Galerie Mäder, Basel 2007, ISBN 978-3-905483-68-0.
- Patrick Marcolli: Rosa Lachenmeier – Unterwegs. Ed. Franz Mäder, Basel 2003.
- Aurel Schmidt: Rosa Lachenmeier – Wasserwerke. Ed. Franz Mäder, Basel 2001, ISBN 3-905483-48-3.
- Robert Schiess: Rosa Lachenmeier – Weltbilder. BookART, Basel 1992, ISBN 3-9520268-1-6.

=== Artist's books ===
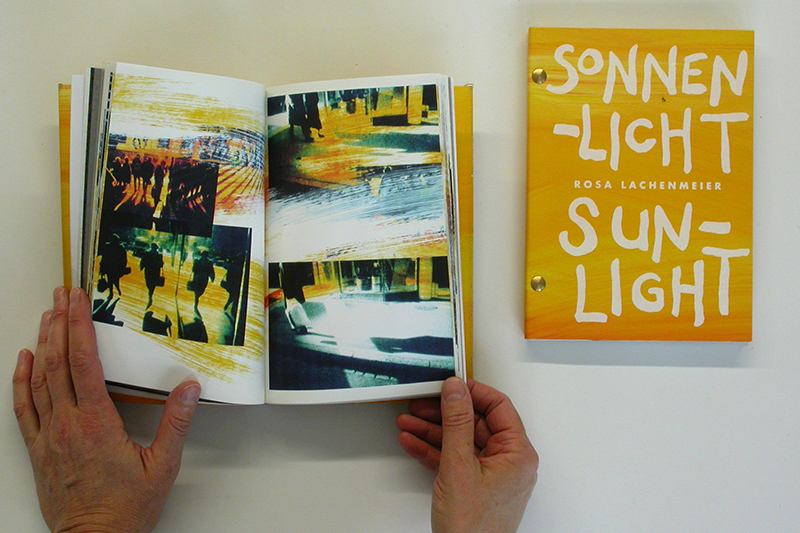
Artist's book by Rosa Lachenmeier: Sonnenlicht – Sunlight, BookART, Basel 1995.

- The Sound of New York Bridges. Rosa Lachenmeier, BookART, Birsfelden 2020, ISBN 978-3-9520268-8-3.
- Bridges – Brücken. Text von Rosa Lachenmeier, Basel 2016.
- Mäder Heft Siebzehn. Text von Martin Zingg, Edition Franz Mäder, Basel 2011, ISBN 3-905483-86-6.
- Vorübergehend. Text von Rudolf Bussmann, Edition Franz Mäder, Basel 2003.
- Biotop – Biotope. BookART, Basel 1999, ISBN 3-9520268-7-5.
- Auf dem Terrain des Lebens – On life's terrain. BookART, Basel 1997, ISBN 3-9520268-6-7.
- Stadtleben – Citylife. BookART, Basel 1996, ISBN 3-9520268-5-9.
- Sonnenlicht – Sunlight. Text von Hedy Graber. BookART, Basel 1995, ISBN 3-9520268-4-0.
- Herzschlag – Heartbeat. Text von Hedy Graber. BookART, Basel 1994, ISBN 3-9520268-3-2.
- News. BookART, Basel 1993, ISBN 3-9520268-2-4.
- Sequenz der Satelliten. BookART, Basel 1992, ISBN 3-9520268-0-8.
- Planet. Zeig-Verlag, Basel 1990, ISBN 3-909237-01-0.

== Collections ==
Works by Rosa Lachenmeier are in the following collections:

- Joan Flasch Artists´ Book Collection, Chicago
- The Artists' Book Collection of the Banff Center, Paul D. Fleck Library & Archives, Alberta, Kanada
- Art collection Alison & Peter W. Klein, Germany
- Bouwfonds Art Collection, Hoevelaken Netherland
- Dachser Intelligent Logistics
