= Eva Aeppli =

Swiss artist

- Born: 2 May 1925; Zofingen, Switzerland
- Died: 4 May 2015 (aged 90)
- Known for: Painting, sculpture
- Notable work: in museums: Moderna Museet; Musée National d'Art Moderne; Kunstmuseum Solothurn; Omaha, Nebraska (USA) Collection Old Omaha Association; Museum of Modern Art Vienna MUMOK; Kunsthaus Zurich
- Movement: Avant-garde
- Spouse(s): Hans Leu (1946-1949); Jean Tinguely (1951-1960); Samuel Mercer (1962-2013)
- Patrons: Pontus Hultén

Eva Aeppli (2 May 1925 – 4 May 2015) was a Swiss artist.

== Personal life ==
Born on 2 May 1925 in Zofingen, Switzerland, Aeppli spent her childhood in Basel where she attended the School of Decorative Arts. Her father was a Waldorf educator and child development author, Willi Aeppli, who worked with Rudolf Steiner.

She moved to France in 1952 with her second husband, the sculptor Jean Tinguely. Subsequently, she began her artistic career as a painter in Paris. From 1954 to 1960 Aeppli and Tinguely shared a living and working space, at the Impasse Ronsin, opposite Constantin Brâncuși's which had been there since 1916. They belonged to the Parisian avantgarde with other artists Daniel Spoerri, Yves Klein and Niki de Saint-Phalle. Eva Aeppli became interested in sculpting figurines in textile and bronze.

In 1971 her work La Table featured as part of the ROSC ’71 major international modern art exhibition held at the Royal Dublin Society in Ireland.

In 1975, she discovered astrology thanks to Jacques Berthon and the painter Eric Leraille. Fifteen years later, she decided to combat poverty, oppression and ignorance by creating the Myrrahkir Foundation. Aeppli lived until the age of 90. Aeppli died on 4 May 2015 in Honfleur, France.

Aeppli's first child, with architect Hans Leu, was Felix Leu (1945 – 2002). Her grandchildren include Jane (1965), Filip (1967), Ama (1968), Ajja (1975) and artist Aia Leu (1971). Aeppli's daughter with Jean Tinguely is painter Miriam Tinguely.
