= Japanland: A Year in Search of Wa =

2005 book by Karin Muller

- Cover of first print edition
- Author: Karin Muller
- Language: English
- Subject: Japan
- Publisher: Rodale
- Publication date: 2005
- Publication place: United States
- Media type: Print (hardcover)
- ISBN: 9781594862236

Japanland: A Year in Search of Wa is a 2004 documentary television series (broadcast in late 2005) and book by American documentary filmmaker and travel author Karin Muller, who spent a year in Japan searching for wa, the Japanese concept of harmony.

== Production ==
Muller, a former Peace Corps volunteer, became interested in judo while working in Washington, D.C., and her teachers there encouraged her to visit Japan to gain an understanding of Japanese culture, particularly the concept of "wa". Her subsequent one-year solo trip around Japan was the basis of the book Japanland as well as a three-hour set of documentaries shown on U.S. television channel PBS. Muller observed Japanese cultural activities such as archery and sword-making. She also walked on hot coals, shared a meal with sumo wrestlers, attempted to harvest rice, and completed a pilgrimage around Shikoku.

== Reception ==
In its review of the book Japanland, The New York Times praised Muller's "fresh eye" but also suggested that "an element of fiction has crept in". Writing for Library Journal, Harold Otness criticized Muller as "prone to generalizations" and noted that she "complains too much about her problems with her host family and other self-imposed discomforts". The Chicago Tribune summarized the book as "smart, funny, and entertaining". The Los Angeles Times commended the book's "refusal to romanticize Japanese culture and traditions, particularly certain aspects of women's lives", while noting in a review of the documentary series that Muller has a "gift for pointing her camera in the right direction and holding it still".
