= Maria Cecilia Adelaide Bass =

Swiss artist (1897–1948)

- Born: 7 September 1897; Perosa Argentina, Turin, Italy
- Died: 11 September 1948 (aged 51); Basel, Switzerland
- Other names: Maria Cecilia von Salis-Bass
- Known for: Painting,
- Spouse: Ado von Salis

Maria Cecilia Adelaide Bass (1897–1948) was an Italian-born Swiss artist.

== Biography ==
Bass was born on 7 September 1897 in the Perosa Argentina region of Turin, Italy. She attended the Ecole des Beaux-Arts in Geneva and the Académie Ranson in Paris. In 1927 she married Ado von Salis, who she later divorced. Through the 1920s and 1930s Bass traveled throughout Europe. She settled in Switzerland in 1936, first to take care of her mother and then to become involved in the design of the Engadin Schweizerische Schulwandbildwerk, and founding the Celerina division of the Bündner Heimatwerk. Bass died of cancer on 11 September 1948 in Basel, Switzerland. Her work is in the Kunstmuseum Bern, the Bündner Kunstmuseum, and the Bundesamt für Kultur.

== Gallery ==
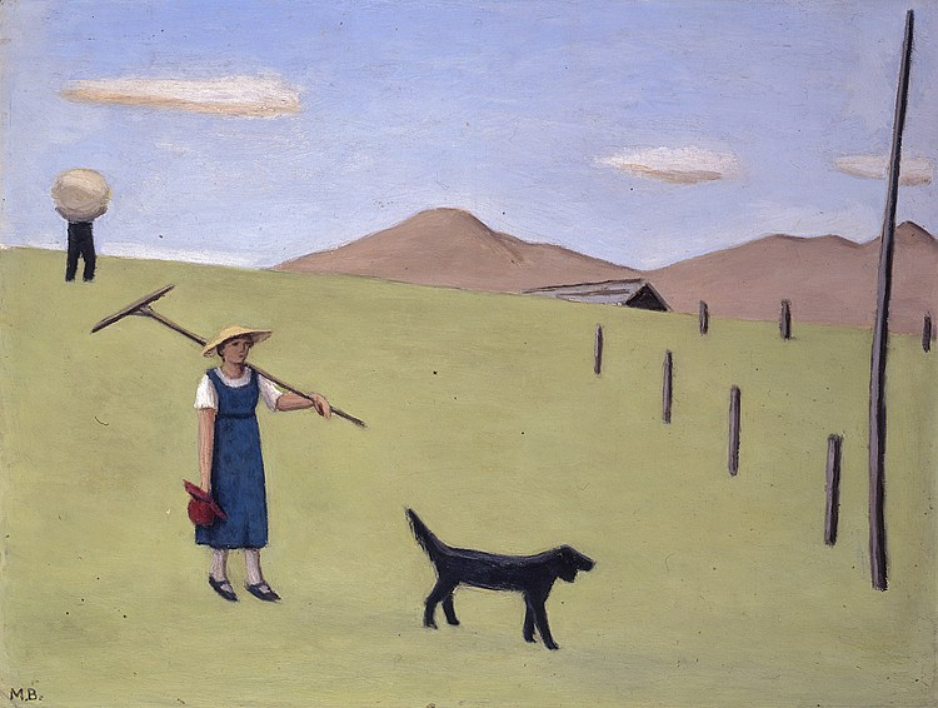
Mittagsstunde auf der Alp 1947

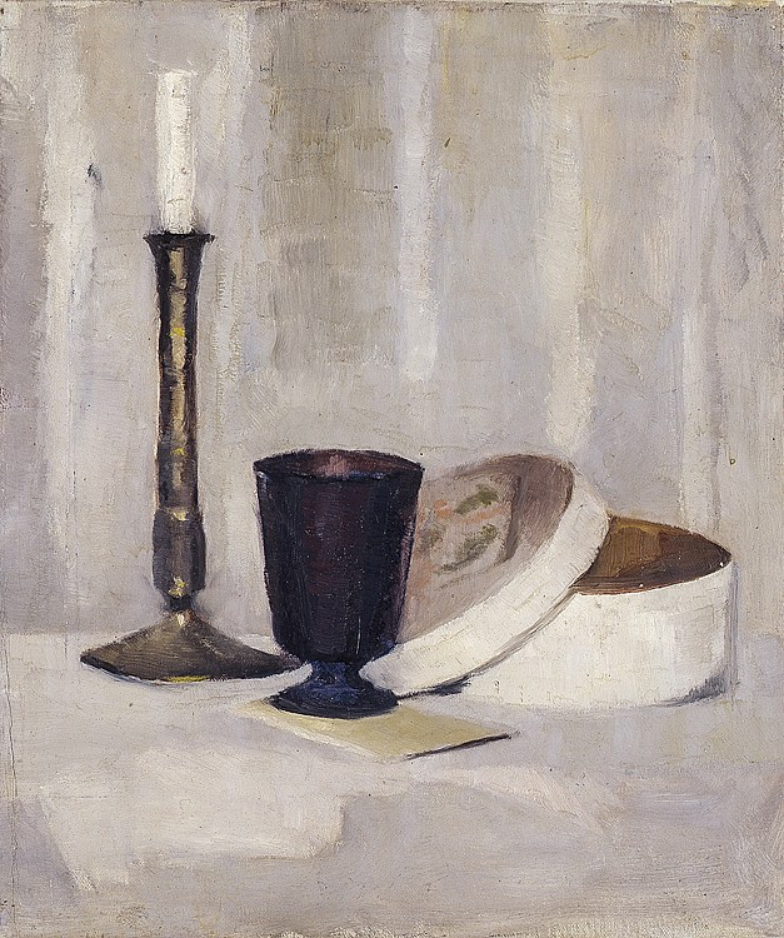
Kerze mit Becher

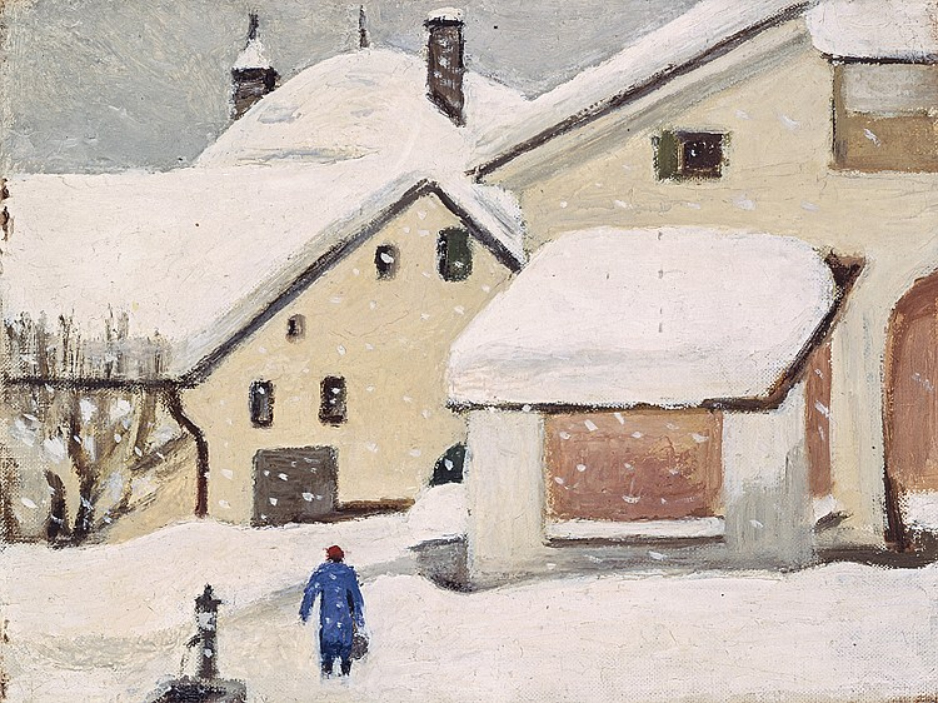
Schnee 1936
