= Relaxation response =

Relaxation response may refer to:

- The Relaxation Response, a term coined by Herbert Benson and a book of the same name in which he describes his research into the effects of meditation
- Dielectric relaxation, the relaxation response of a dielectric medium to an external electric field of microwave frequencies
