= Christine Hiebert =

American artist

Christine Hiebert (born 1960) is a Swiss-born American artist known for her drawing. Her work is included in the collections of the Whitney Museum of American Art and the Metropolitan Museum of Art. She was raised in Pennsylvania and was educated at the University of the Arts.
