= Annie Stebler-Hopf =

Swiss-born painter (1861–1918)

- Born: 4 September 1861; Thun, Switzerland
- Died: 30 January 1918 (aged 56); Zürich, Switzerland
- Known for: Painting

Annie Stebler-Hopf (4 September 1861 – 30 January 1918), also known as Anny Hopf or Anna Hopf, was a Swiss painter. She trained in Basel, Berlin, and Paris, and worked as a portrait, genre, landscape, and anatomical painter. She is especially known for her anatomical studies, above all Am Seziertisch (Professor Poirier, Paris) (c. 1889). In 2023, the Kunstmuseum Bern held the first monographic exhibition devoted to her work, and her work was also shown at the Städel Museum in 2024.

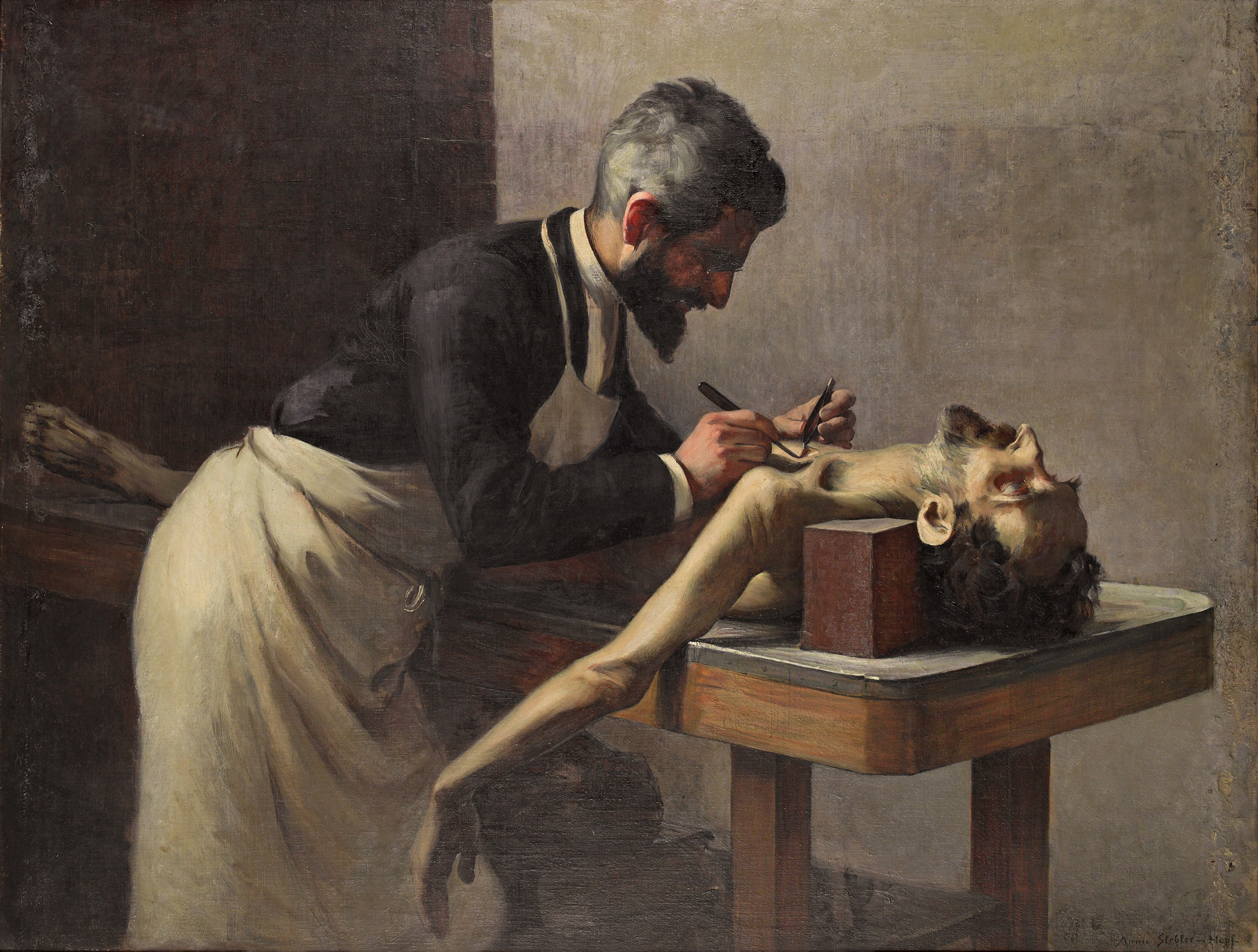
Am Seziertisch (Professor Poirier, Paris), 1889

== Biography ==
Stebler-Hopf was born on 4 September 1861 in Thun, Switzerland. After initial drawing lessons at the Kunstschule Basel, she continued her training from about 1879 to 1882 in the women's studio of the portrait painter Karl Gussow in Berlin. There she met Ottilie W. Roederstein, with whom she formed a lifelong friendship. In 1882, the two moved to Paris, where Stebler-Hopf studied at the Académie Julian. Around 1884, she studied in the atelier of Luc-Olivier Merson and in the women's studio of Jean-Jacques Henner and Carolus-Duran.

She first exhibited at the Salon des Artistes français in 1884 and continued to do so almost annually until 1890; in 1892 and 1893 she also exhibited at the Salon de la Société nationale des beaux-arts. From the 1890s onward, she also exhibited regularly in Switzerland, including at the National Art Exhibitions and Turnus exhibitions.

In 1895, she married the Zurich merchant Emil Stebler and settled in Zurich. Health problems repeatedly forced her to limit her painting activity, but she remained active as a painter until 1914. She died in Zurich on 30 January 1918.

== Works ==
Stebler-Hopf worked as a portrait, genre, landscape, and anatomical painter. She is especially known for her anatomical studies, above all the large-format painting Am Seziertisch (Professor Poirier, Paris) (c. 1889), now in the Kunstmuseum Bern. Her work also included Christian subjects, high-alpine landscapes, and small-format domestic scenes. Among her known works are Religiöse Versammlung bei Guillaume Monod (1891), Entre nous (Familienbild) (1904), Cathédrale de Reims (1905), and Abendbeleuchtung eines kleinen Sees am Matterhorn. Around 20 of her paintings are in the Kunstmuseum Bern, and an album in the museum archive helps reconstruct an oeuvre of about 50 works.

In 2023, the Kunstmuseum Bern held the first monographic exhibition devoted to her work. Her work was also shown at the Städel Museum in 2024.
