= Valentine Pasche =

Swiss francophone comics creator (born 1979)

Valp (born Valentine Pasche in 1979 in Geneva, Switzerland) is a Swiss francophone comics creator.

== Biography ==
After studying three years at the school « Arts Décoratifs » at Geneva, Valp begins her career as a Comics creator. She finds her inspiration in fantasy, science fiction and steampunk literature and cinema. Especially Star Trek, Harry Potter, Sherlock Holmes, and the stories of Lovecraft. She draws almost every day sketches on her Instagram account. Her first series of five albums, takes place in a world called Lock. This world without sky, wild and mechanical, is fraught with danger. The series tells the story of a group of characters who are looking to escape from this world. Her second series is called "Ashrel". It is a medieval fantasy adventure. The first volume of her second series was published May 20, 2009 and received the Töpffer award of the city of Geneva, December 4, 2009. The first volume of her third series, "Les fantômes de Neptune", was published in 2015. It is a steampunk adventure comics, that takes place in 1890, in an alternative Europe, where scientific progress is so advanced that it allows to start the space exploration.

== Bibliography ==
- Lock Tome 1 - Nepharius, 2001
- Lock Tome 2 - Mécanique Céleste, 2002
- Lock Tome 3 - Le Prix du Passé, 2004
- Lock Hors-Série - Le Guide de Lock, 2004
- Lock Tome 4 - Abrasombra, 2006
- Lock Tome 5 - Langorytes, 2007
- Lock - L'Intégrale, 2008
- Ashrel Tome 1 - Dragon, 2009
- Ashrel Tome 2 - Wesconda, 2010
- Ashrel Tome 3 - Tanatis, 2011
- Ashrel Tome 4 - Le cercle noir, 2012
- Sketchbook Valp, 2011
- Les Fantômes de Neptune – 1. Kheropis, 2015

== Awards ==
- Soleil D'Or for the best colourist, Solliès-Ville, 2003
- Töpffer award, Geneva, 2009
- Prix Cluny, 2010
- Marraine, Cluny, 2017
