= RELAX (chiarenza & hauser & co) =

Swiss-based artist collective

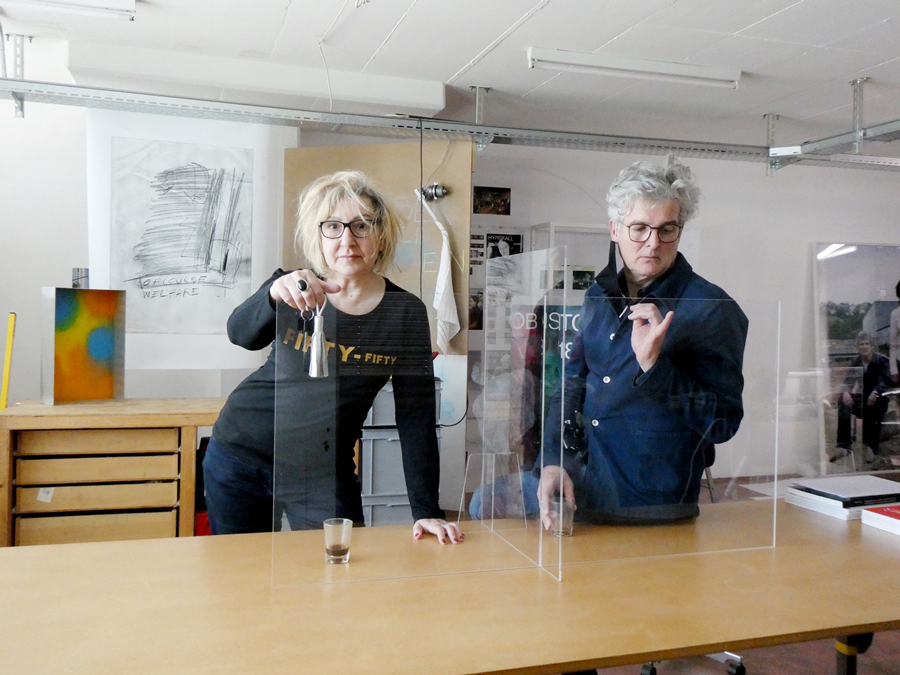
- Education: Sorbonne Paris, MassArt Boston, University of Bern
- Known for: Installations in context
- Notable work: Thinking alone is criminal, 1991
- Awards: Prix Meret Oppenheim, 2002
- Website: http://www.relax-studios.ch

RELAX (chiarenza & hauser & co) is an artist collective founded by Marie-Antoinette Chiarenza and Daniel Hauser.

Chiarenza & Hauser art works and public projects have been realized and exhibited in Europe and the Americas since 1983. Since 2003 the RELAX studios have been located in Zurich, Switzerland.

== Life and work ==
RELAX is a collective co-founded by Marie-Antoinette Chiarenza (born 1957 in Tunis, Tunisia), artist and since 2010 lecturer at the Geneva University of Art and Design, and Daniel Hauser (born 1959 in Bern, Switzerland), artist and since 2000 head of the art studies programme at the F+F School of Art and Design. In the summer of 2013, Chiarenza and Hauser were resident faculty members at the Skowhegan School of Painting and Sculpture.

=== Name ===
The name of the collective was initially Chiarenza & Hauser, then changed to CH2 to become RELAX (chiarenza & hauser & co). RELAX is always written in uppercase letters. As indicated in the monograph we save what you give (2006), the "& co" stands for partners that change depending on the project.

=== Statements ===
The collective became known with statements such as thinking alone is criminal (1991), FIFTY-fifty (1991), artists are no flags (1993). The statements became an object with: you pay but you don't agree with the price (1994-2013), and to a photo with: I am a woman, why are you not? (1995).

=== Artistic practice ===
RELAX’ artistic practice and exhibition activities include projects in public spheres, personal and group shows, lectures and performances at Swiss and international art institutions.

In 1983, collaborative works started at Gyrophare, a squat in a former factory in northern Paris that was transformed by artists and neighbourhood residents into an artist studio house, an event space, and a community center.

During the first ten years, the artists developed a critical approach to the production of art objects, using interdisciplinarity to develop mostly site-specific art. They have developed an artistic practice based on contextualization, intervention and infiltration. Their practice is dedicated to concerns including feminism and feminist art history, the canon in art history, critical masculinity, social hierarchizations, access and affiliation in society.

From 1985 to 2002 Chiarenza & Hauser pursued their collective projects in artist studios of the city of Biel-Bienne, since 2003 RELAX are based in Zurich.

For their research and projects they have completed numerous fellowships and artist-in-residence programs, mainly in Western and Eastern Europe, North and Latin America.

In 1994 they realized Thank You, a collaborative and interactive installation at Capp Street Project (CSP) in San Francisco, on issues about art and money, using a coffee bar, video and audio interviews. CSP is now run by the CCA Wattis Institute for Contemporary Arts.

In June 2000 RELAX represented Switzerland at the Venice Biennale of Architecture, in Less Esthetics more Ethics, a group exhibition organized by the Federal Office of Culture.

In 2004 RELAX realised a permanent work at the Headquarters of the United Nations in New York City, under the title INLAY consisting of "a set of renovated rooms forming the backstage of the General Assembly." according to the Metropolis magazine. The Inlays consisted of the word peace in the six official languages of the UN (Arabic, Chinese, French, English, Russian and Spanish) are placed on various surfaces in 12 places within the overall space and its furnishings. The materials used for the inlays, which are no longer than an inch, are diamonds, gold, white gold, tantalum and exotic woods. Use of such precious materials is meant to provoke thought about the real value of peace and how costly it can be. This message is directly aimed at those in power who will speak in front of the General Assembly“.

In 2006 the Kunstmuseum Liechtenstein describes the neon sign WHO PAYS?, which is part of the museum collection, elaborating that "the critical analysis of the significance of economic values and the status of art and its players is formative of the work of the artist group RELAX".

The culture of economy is a constant in RELAX works, as the curators of the 2009 Festival of the Free Slow University of Warsaw mention: "RELAX Studios is concentrated on the ties between artistic production and economic and political social structures. They are renowned as creators of conceptual interventions in public spaces, interferences in office buildings, company and organisation seats".

Through video essays with activist and political philosopher Silvia Federici and with feminist economist and expert on care work Mascha Madörin from 2014 to 2017, RELAX have addressed concerns such as: the stigmatization and displacement of women from public life during the transition from the Middle Ages to early capitalism; the dispossession of rural people forced into wage labor; furthermore, the contemporary absence of domestic, nurturing, and care work in the representation of contemporary economic balances. These works were shown in installations within thematic exhibitions at the Museo Arte Gallarate, Kunstmuseum Luzern, Helmhaus Zurich and Kunstmuseum Liechtenstein as well as in a workshop with Mascha Madörin and in a guest_*talk between Silvia Federici and Mascha Madörin in collaboration with the F+F School of Art and Design.

In 2018, the Collection of Prints and Drawings at ETH Zurich commissioned RELAX to take a closer look at the works in the collection, their location, and how the collection has been built up over the past 151 years. The result was an exhibition titled what do we want to keep? that sheds a whole new light on the works on display in the collection, focusing on representations of women engaged in paid work, representations of (mostly) female artists, addressing issues of the gaze in art and canonizing processes and their influence on the economic value of art Central to this exhibition, is the video ongoing research , in which the artists paid homage to Linda Nochlin, referencing her famous 1971 essay "Why Have There Been No Great Women Artists?".

== Gallery ==
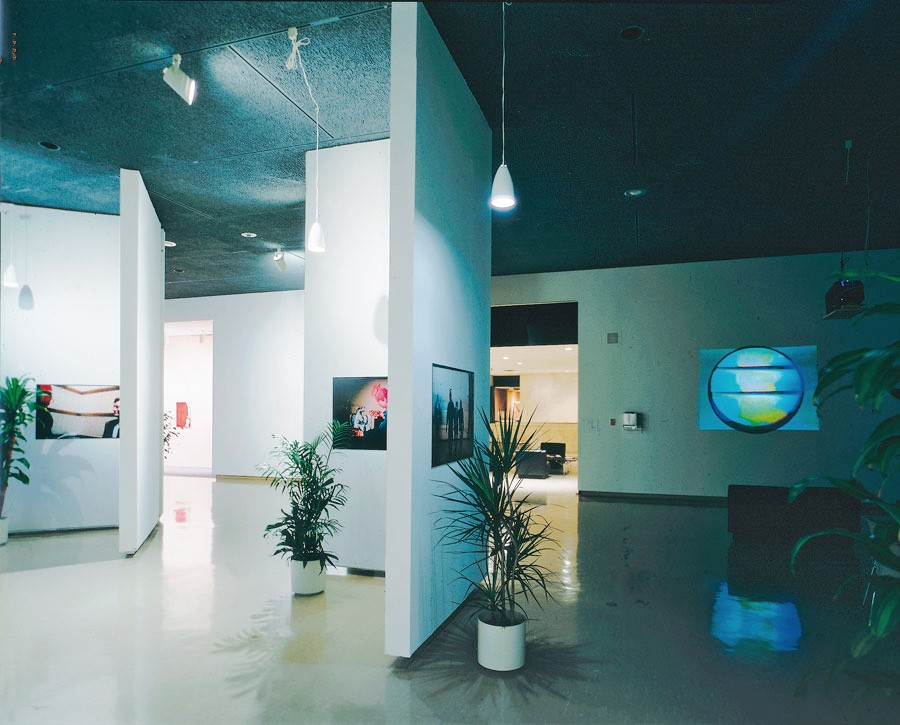
RELAX (chiarenza & hauser & co), goldfinger, 1993

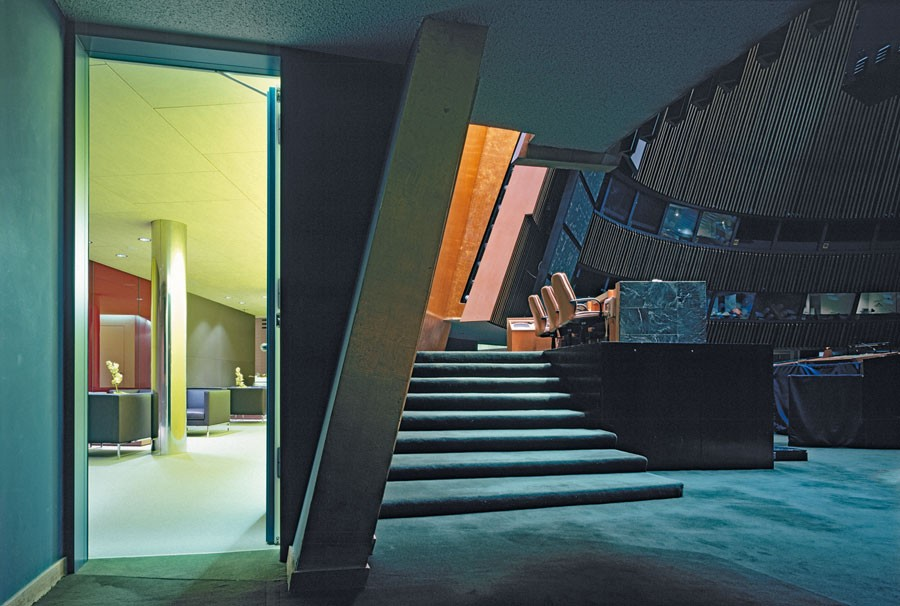
RELAX (chiarenza & hauser & co), INLAY, since 2004, commissioned project, UN Headquarter New York City

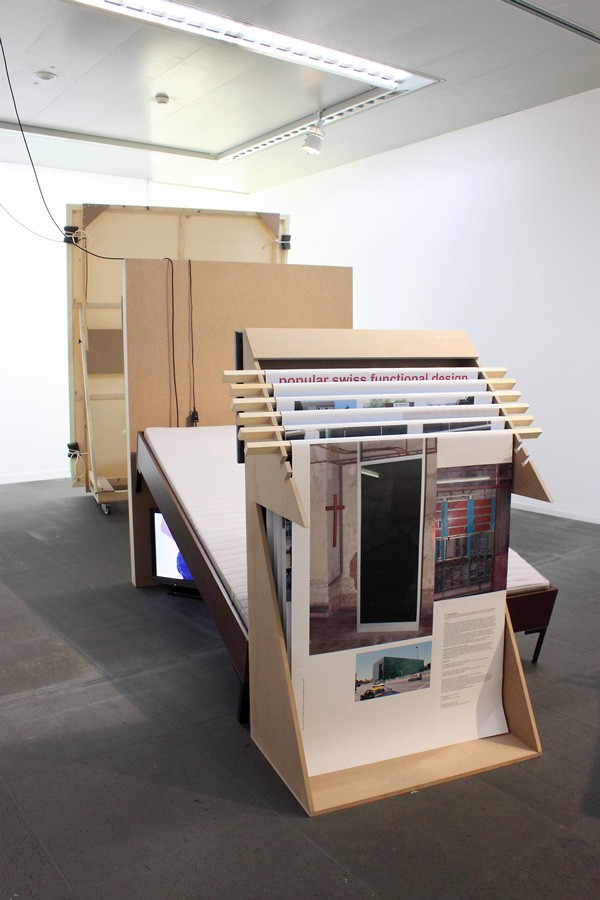
RELAX (chiarenza & hauser & co), invest & drawwipe, 2011

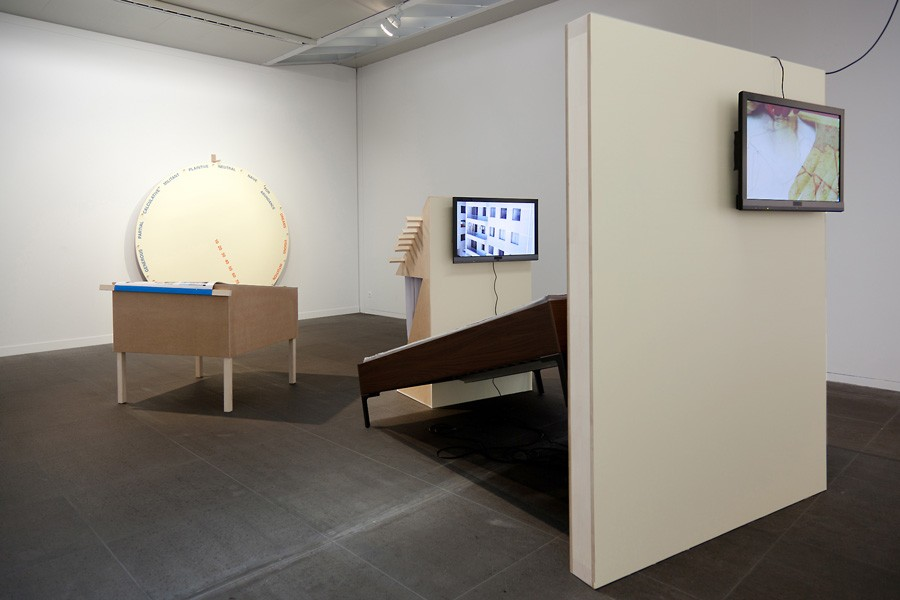
RELAX (chiarenza & hauser & co), invest & drawwipe, 2011

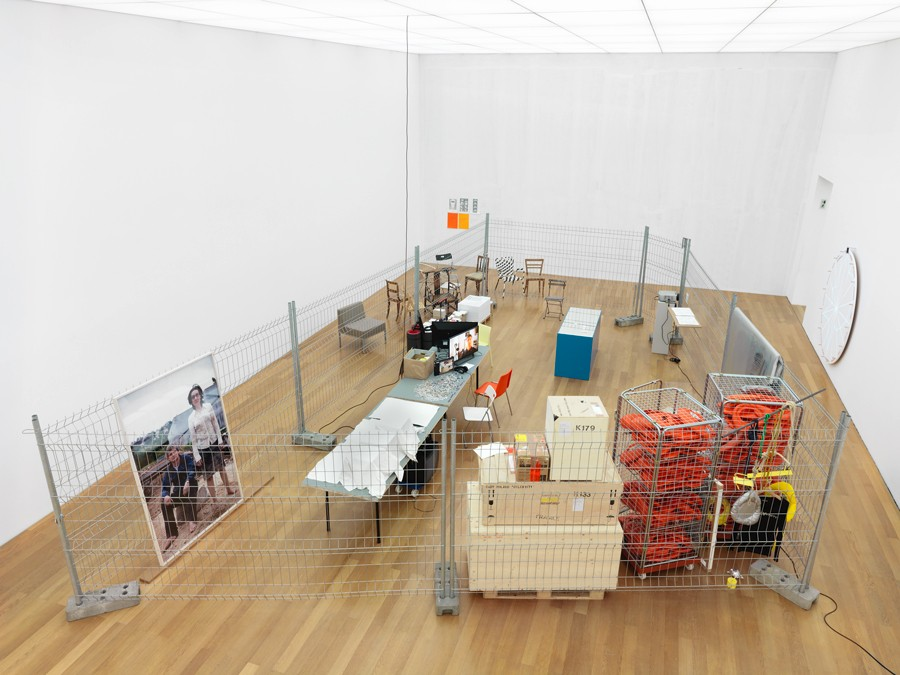
RELAX (chiarenza & hauser & co), what is wealth?, 2017

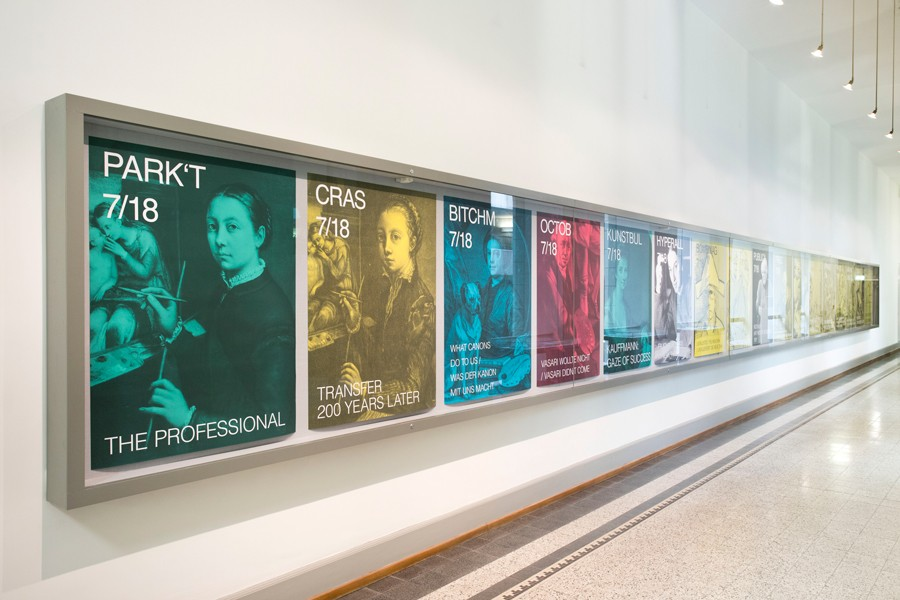
RELAX (chiarenza & hauser & co), canon? 17 covers for art magazines, 2018, digital print on paper, in: what do we want to keep?

== Exhibitions ==
=== Solo exhibitions ===
Capp Street Project San Francisco (1994)

Center for Contemporary Art Tbilisi, Georgia (2015)

Cornerhouse Manchester, England (2010)

Graphische Sammlung ETH Zurich (2018)

Hood Museum of Art, Dartmouth College, Hanover, NH (1999)

Kunsthalle Basel (1992)

Kunsthaus Centre Pasquart Biel-Bienne (2005)

Kunsthaus Glarus (1994)

Künstlerhaus Bethanien Berlin (2003)

Kunstmuseum Thurgau, Kartause Ittingen (1994)

Museum Folkwang Essen (2008)

Shedhalle Zurich (1990)

Stadtgalerie Saarbrücken (1995)

The Corridor Reykjavik (1989)

=== Group exhibitions ===
Aargauer Kunsthaus Aarau (1991, 2021)

Kunsthalle Bern (1998, 1999)

Kunstmuseum Bern (2011, 2018)

Fondazione Michelangelo Pistoletto Biella (2002)

Museo de la Solidaridad Salvador Allende, Santiago de Chile (2010)

Fri-Art Kunsthalle Fribourg (2007)

Museo Arte Gallarate (2015)

Steirischer Herbst Graz (1991, 2007)

Dunkers Culture Center Helsingborg (2003)

Kunsthaus Langenthal (2008)

Kunstmuseum Liechtenstein (2017, 2021)

Kunstmuseum Lucerne (2015, 2017)

Art en plein air, Môtiers (2007, 2015)

City of Munich (2006)

CAN Neuchâtel (2016)

Swiss Institute New York City (1999)

Sinopale 5, Sinop (2014)

1st Tbilisi Triennial, CCA Tbilisi (2012)

Venice Biennial, 7. Int. Architecture Show, Swiss Pavilion (2000)

Kunst Haus Garage, Vienna (2016)

Museum of Modern Art Warsaw (2009)

Passengers-Festival Warsaw (2009)

Helmhaus Zurich (2017)

Kunsthaus Zurich (2008, 2022)

Manifesta 11, Löwenbräu-Kunst, Zurich (2016)

Shedhalle Zurich (2004, 2008)

== Awards and residencies ==
Bernische Kunstgesellschaft Bern (1989)

Capp Street Project San Francisco, residency (1994)

Dartmouth College, Hanover, New Hampshire, residency (1999)

Ernst Anderfuhren Foundation Biel-Bienne (1994)

Künstlerhaus Bethanien Berlin, residency (1993)

London grant by Landis & Gyr Foundation, Zug, residency (2008)

Prix Meret Oppenheim, Swiss Federal Office for Culture, Bern (2002)

Swiss Institute, Rome, residency (1997)

Work year awarded by the City of Zurich (2016)

== Public collections ==
Aargauer Kunsthaus Aarau

Kunstmuseum Bern

n.b.k. Neuer Berliner Kunstverein, Berlin

Swiss Federal Art Collection, Bern

Swiss Federal Library, Bern

Collection of the Canton of Bern

Collection of the City of Biel-Bienne

Kunsthaus Centre Pasquart Biel-Bienne

University of Graz

ZKM Center for Art and Media, Karlsruhe

EFTA-Court Luxemburg

United Nations Headquarters, New York

Museo de la Solidaridad Salvador Allende, Santiago de Chile

Kunstmuseum Liechtenstein, Vaduz

City of Vaduz, Principality of Liechtenstein

Collection of the Canton of Valais

Ursula Blicke Video Archive, Belvedere Vienna

Kunstmuseum Thurgau, Kartause Ittingen, Warth

Graphic Art Collection ETH Zurich

Kunsthaus Zürich

Collection of the City of Zurich

Collection of the Canton of Zurich
