= Elvezia Michel-Baldini =

Swiss painter, book illustrator and philanthropist

Elvezia Michel-Baldini (Lisieux, France, 17 August 1887 – Soglio, Switzerland, 14 June 1963) was a Swiss painter, book illustrator and philanthropist.
