= Miriam Tinguely =

Swiss artist (born 1950)

- Born: 1950 (age 75–76); Basel, Switzerland
- Known for: Painting, engraving

Miriam Tinguely (born 1950) is a Swiss artist who started painting when she was 15. Born to two well-known artists, Jean Tinguely and Eva Aeppli, she was raised by her paternal grandparents in Geneva and Bulle and rarely saw her famous parents during her childhood, though her mother supported her artistic pursuits. She took an apprenticeship with photographer Jacques Thévoz, then began to travel when she was 16.

In 1978, Tinguely moved to San Francisco and worked there for 20 years. Her first exhibit was in 1982 in San Francisco. During her time in California, she created large oil paintings and wood sculptures. She continued to exhibit her work in the United States, and expanded to European galleries.

After she moved back to Switzerland, Tinguely became intrigued with the process of engraving, and began experimenting with it. Her more recent work is a combination of drawing, watercolor, engraving, and collage. In contrast to her earlier output, her later art is mostly diminutive in size, often only a few inches across.

Tinguely has had many solo exhibitions during her life, and has often participated in group exhibits. Several of her works are held permanently in the Atelier-Galerie J.-J. Hofstetter in Fribourg and, in 2016, she was Artist-in-Residence at kunstGarten, Graz, Austria.
