= Plateforme 10 =

Arts and museum district in Lausanne, Switzerland

- Established: June 24, 2022; 4 years ago
- Location: Place de la Gare, Lausanne, Canton of Vaud, Switzerland
- Coordinates: 46°31′10″N 6°37′50″E
- Type: Art district / museum campus
- Visitors: 353,000 (2023)
- Directors: Patrick Gyger (director general, Fondation Plateforme 10)
- Owner: Fondation Plateforme 10
- Website: www.plateforme10.ch

Plateforme 10 is an arts district in Lausanne, in the Canton of Vaud, Switzerland, located next to Lausanne railway station. It brings together, on a single site, three cantonal museums: the Musée cantonal des Beaux-Arts (Cantonal Museum of Fine Arts, MCBA), the Museum of Contemporary Design and Applied Arts (mudac), and Photo Elysée, the cantonal museum of photography (formerly the Musée de l'Élysée). The site also hosts the collections of the Fondation Toms Pauli (textile arts) and the Fondation Félix Vallotton.

The project, first known as "Plate-forme pôle muséal" and later renamed Plateforme 10, was launched after voters in the canton rejected funding for a new fine arts museum at Bellerive in November 2008. A new site next to the railway station, formerly occupied by Swiss Federal Railways locomotive halls, was selected in 2007. The MCBA building, designed by the Barcelona firm Estudio Barozzi Veiga, opened in October 2019, and the shared building housing mudac and Photo Elysée, designed by the Portuguese firm Aires Mateus, opened to the public in 2021–2022. The whole district was formally inaugurated in June 2022. The Fondation Plateforme 10, a public-law foundation, was created to manage the site and the three museums; Patrick Gyger has served as its director general since January 2021.

== History ==
=== Origins ===
On 24 November 2002, voters in the Canton of Vaud rejected a CHF 390,000 study credit intended to finalise a project for a new Musée cantonal des Beaux-Arts at Bellerive, in Lausanne, ending that project. Following the rejection, State Councillors Anne-Catherine Lyon, Pascal Broulis and François Marthaler launched a consultation process to select a new site for the museum.

On 30 May 2007, after examining eleven eligible submissions, the Council of State announced that it had selected a 25,000 m² site occupied by former Swiss Federal Railways (SBB/CFF) locomotive halls, next to Lausanne railway station, as the future home of the museum. In 2011, the Grand Council voted a study credit enabling an architectural competition for the future MCBA building and for a wider cultural precinct that would eventually also house mudac and Photo Elysée. The competition, titled "Pôle muséal et culturel – Nouveau Musée cantonal des Beaux-Arts", attracted entries from 16 countries; 18 firms were shortlisted. The winner, announced on 9 June 2011, was the Barcelona-based practice Estudio Barozzi Veiga, formed by Italian architect Fabrizio Barozzi and Spanish architect Alberto Veiga.

Objections and legal appeals relating to the planned demolition of the former locomotive depot, which held a "note 2" heritage rating in the cantonal architectural inventory, were rejected by the Cantonal Court and then by the Federal Supreme Court, which found in October 2014 that the building was not considered to be of national importance; the cantonal land-use plan for the site came into force after the Federal Supreme Court rejected a final appeal against it. In 2014, the Grand Council approved construction credits for the MCBA and study credits for the mudac and Photo Elysée buildings, adopting them by 105 votes to 0, with 7 abstentions. Following the public consultation on the future MCBA building, the City of Lausanne received 186 objections; two related appeals were dismissed by the Cantonal Court on 20 May 2015, and a final appeal against the demolition and construction permits was rejected by the Federal Supreme Court. Construction of the MCBA began in 2015, marked by a foundation-stone ceremony.

A second architectural competition, for the mudac and Photo Elysée building, opened in January 2015 and attracted expressions of interest from 149 firms. On 5 October 2015 the jury selected the winning project, "Un musée, deux musées" ("One museum, two museums"), by the Portuguese architects Manuel and Francisco Aires Mateus. On 8 February 2017 the Council of State submitted to the Grand Council a proposal for a construction credit of CHF 51.8 million for the mudac and Photo Elysée building and the complementary programme, which also formally established Plateforme 10's governing council. The City of Lausanne granted a long-term building right (droit de superficie) over the site and contributed CHF 20 million toward construction, including relocation costs for mudac's collections, and transferred mudac and its staff into the new cantonal public-law foundation. Construction of the mudac/Photo Elysée building began in 2018.

=== Opening ===
The MCBA opened in its new building in October 2019, and experienced several temporary closures in 2020 and 2021 due to the COVID-19 pandemic. The Fondation Plateforme 10 was established around this time to manage the district and its three museums, with Patrick Gyger appointed director general and taking office on 1 January 2021.

The new building for mudac and Photo Elysée was presented to the public during open days in November 2021, and the whole arts district was formally inaugurated in June 2022. Plateforme 10 reported approximately 350,000 visits to the site in 2023.

=== Preview events ===
In preparation for the opening, several public events were organised on and around the future site. From 5 to 14 June 2015, "Objectif Gare!" presented a 21-stop art trail leading to the future Plateforme 10 site; the event drew around 30,000 visitors, with exhibitions, installations, urban interventions, performances and workshops. In 2016, at the request of the three museums, Swiss artist Augustin Rebetez presented the work "Musée carton" at artgeneve and later at the Rencontres d'Arles. The project has also been presented at international events, including a conference at the Venice Biennale of Architecture and a 2016 lecture series at the Casa dell'Architettura in Rome, "Architettura contemporanea in Svizzera. I nuovi Musei e centri culturali", which included a session on the MCBA presented by architect Alberto Veiga of Barozzi/Veiga. Since 2018, Plateforme 10 has run a film series, "Le musée au cinéma", in partnership with the Cinémathèque suisse. In 2019, Plateforme 10 held an international symposium, "Le Musée au défi. Quels rôles pour l'innovation numérique?", on the role of digital innovation in the future museum district, and a construction-site visit of the MCBA and the Plateforme 10 site drew 1,500 visitors.

== Institutions ==
=== Musée cantonal des Beaux-Arts (MCBA) ===
Founded in 1841 by the painter and patron Marc-Louis Arlaud, the MCBA is Vaud's cantonal fine arts museum. Its collection comprises close to 10,000 works spanning the 18th century to post-impressionism, including significant holdings of works by Abraham-Louis-Rodolphe Ducros (1748–1810), Charles Gleyre (1806–1874), Théophile Alexandre Steinlen (1859–1923), Félix Vallotton (1865–1925) and Louis Soutter (1871–1942). The museum is run by a public-law foundation chaired by Olivier Steimer. Bernard Fibicher directed the MCBA from 2007 until his retirement on 30 June 2022; he was succeeded by art historian Juri Steiner, who was appointed in December 2021 and took office on 1 July 2022.

=== Museum of Contemporary Design and Applied Arts (mudac) ===
Formerly the City of Lausanne's Musée des arts décoratifs, mudac holds a permanent collection of around 3,000 objects, including a contemporary glass-art collection considered unique in Europe. Chantal Prod'Hom directed the museum from 2000 until her retirement in 2022. Marco Costantini, who had joined mudac as a curator in 2015 and became deputy director in 2020, served as acting director from July 2023 (following the departure of Prod'Hom's successor, Beatrice Leanza, who had led the museum from January 2023) and was confirmed as director from 1 January 2024. As part of the Plateforme 10 project, mudac transferred from City of Lausanne ownership into the new cantonal public-law foundation.

=== Photo Elysée ===
Founded in 1985 as the Musée de l'Élysée, Photo Élysée holds a collection of close to one million photographic objects (prints, negatives, contact sheets and slides), more than 20,000 books, and around a hundred albums, including the archives of Nicolas Bouvier, René Burri, Charlie Chaplin, Marcel Imsand, Lehnert & Landrock, Ella Maillart, Sabine Weiss and Jan Groover. Nathalie Herschdorfer has directed the museum since 2022.

=== Fondation Toms Pauli ===
Established in 2000, the Fondation Toms Pauli studies, conserves and promotes historic and modern textile art collections owned by the Canton of Vaud, and is housed within the MCBA building on the Plateforme 10 site.

=== Fondation Félix Vallotton ===
Founded in 1998 and chaired by Yves Noël, the Fondation Félix Vallotton is a centre of expertise devoted to the life and work of the Swiss painter, printmaker, illustrator and writer Félix Vallotton (1865–1925), and holds the artist's archives. It is also housed within the MCBA building.

== Architecture ==
The MCBA building, by Estudio Barozzi Veiga, occupies the site of the former SBB/CFF locomotive halls and retains the gable end of the historic building's central nave. Narrower but taller than the assembly of earlier buildings it replaced, it opens up an esplanade bordered to the north by a series of arcades, and incorporates surviving elements of the site's railway heritage, including tracks and the former turntable. The building has a basement for storage and technical spaces, a ground floor opening onto the public square that houses a restaurant, auditorium, bookshop, education spaces and library, and two upper levels of exhibition space—a 1,750 m² permanent-collection gallery and a 1,470 m² temporary-exhibition gallery.

The mudac/Photo Elysée building, by Aires Mateus, houses the two museums in a single volume arranged around a shared, top-lit entrance area, with a common ticketing hall, bookshop and restaurant. Each museum has an exhibition floor of around 1,500 m², roughly double the space each museum previously had at its historic site, with the museum requiring natural light (mudac) built upward and the one that does not (Photo Elysée) set below ground.

A pedestrian and cycling route connects the district's public square to Avenue Marc-Dufour to the west, forming part of the City of Lausanne's mobility masterplan and the Lausanne–Morges agglomeration plan.

Under Vaud's regulation on artistic interventions on state-built buildings, which reserves a share of construction costs for a public artwork on any new state building, a competition was held for a public artwork on the Plateforme 10 site; a jury chaired by cantonal architect Emmanuel Ventura shortlisted 21 of 73 entries in 2016. Artists Olivier Mosset and Xavier Veilhan won the competition with "La Crocodile", a large painted-metal sculpture referencing the historic Crocodile locomotive once used on the site; the sculpture was relocated around the site in stages as construction progressed and the museums opened.

== Funding ==
Total investment in the three museums and the complementary programme has been estimated at around CHF 183.5 million (CHF 83.5 million for phase 1, the MCBA; CHF 100 million for phase 2, mudac and Photo Elysée), funded through a public–private partnership between the Canton of Vaud, the City of Lausanne, and private donors and sponsors.

Phase 1 (MCBA) – CHF 83.5 million
Source	Amount
Canton of Vaud	CHF 44.5 million
City of Lausanne	CHF 5 million
Private partnerships	CHF 34.5 million

Phase 2 (mudac / Photo Elysée) – CHF 100 million
Source	Amount
Canton of Vaud	CHF 40 million
City of Lausanne	CHF 20 million
Private partnerships	CHF 40 million

== Governance ==
Plateforme 10 is managed by the Fondation Plateforme 10, a public-law foundation supported by the Canton of Vaud, whose mission is to manage and develop the three cantonal museums together with the site's shared infrastructure, activities and events. Patrick Gyger, previously director of Le Lieu Unique in Nantes and of the Maison d'Ailleurs in Yverdon-les-Bains, was appointed director general and took office on 1 January 2021.

== Name and identity ==
The project was initially known as "Plate-forme pôle muséal". Following a competition among eight graphic designers, a new identity for the district, created by Régis Tosetti in collaboration with Simon Palmieri, was unveiled in 2016, and the name Plateforme 10 was adopted. The logo references the site's railway heritage: it evokes the turntable that once distributed locomotives on the site, while the number 10 alludes to Lausanne railway station's nine platforms. The name also plays on the double meaning of "platform" as both a railway term and a reference to the site's ambition to serve as an open, multidisciplinary artistic platform.

== See also ==
- Lausanne
- Museum of Contemporary Design and Applied Arts
- Photo Elysée
- List of museums in Switzerland
