= Cantonal Museum of Fine Arts =

Museum in Lausanne, Switzerland

- Musée cantonal des Beaux-Arts
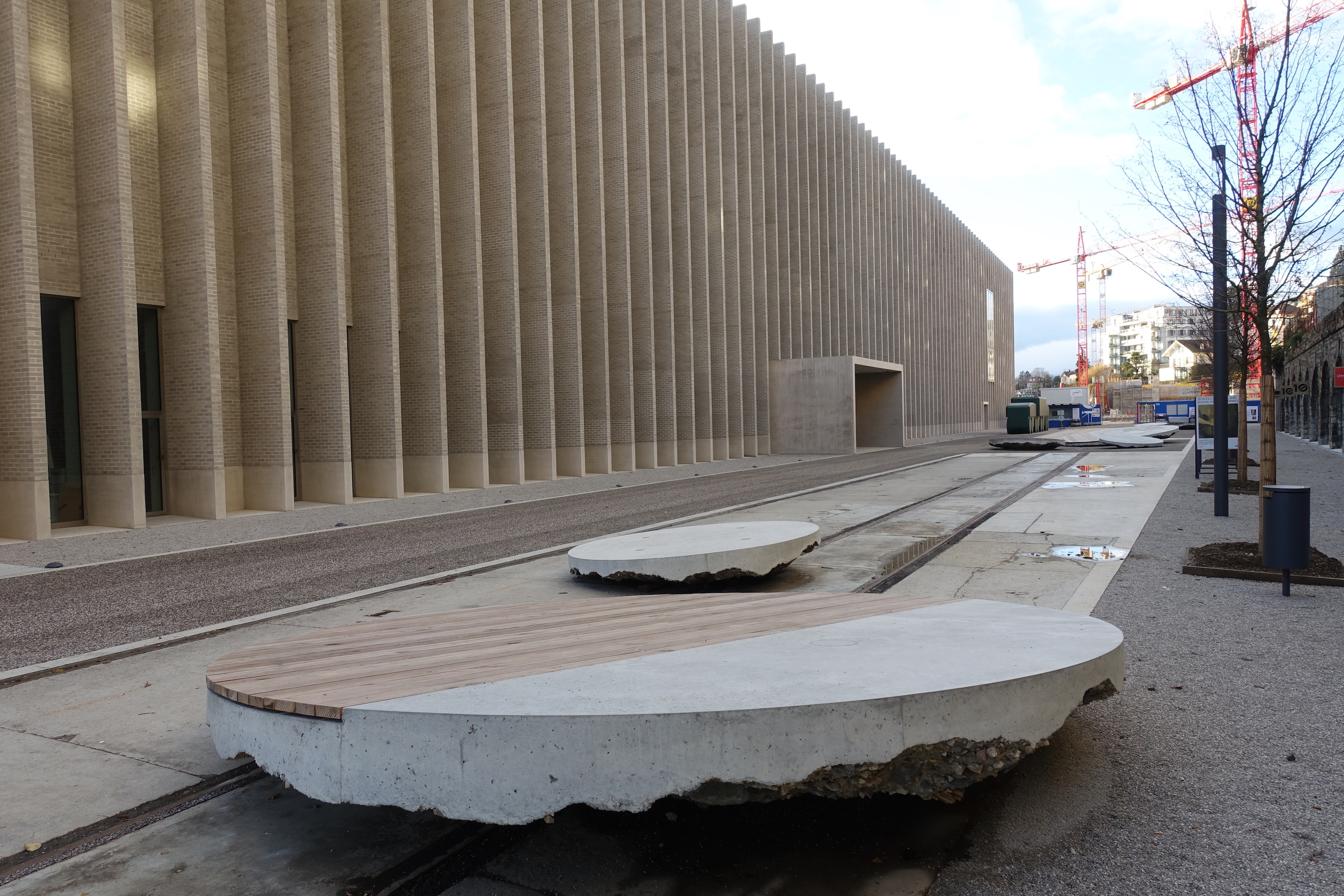
- New building of the MCBA
- Location: Lausanne, Switzerland
- Coordinates: 46.5179913°N 6.6254402°E
- Director: Bernard Fibicher
- Curator: Catherine Lepdor
- Owner: Canton of Vaud
- Website: www.mcba.ch

The Cantonal Museum of Fine Arts (French: Musée cantonal des Beaux-Arts, MCBA) is an art museum in Lausanne, Switzerland.

== Collection ==
The museum was created by private initiative in 1841, with funds provided by the artist Marc-Louis Arlaud, who became its first curator. Private funds still help the acquisition process with gifts and legacies. In 2014, the museum conserved around 10,000 artworks. A part of them retrace a general history of art, beginning with ancient Egypt, but the largest part focuses on art from the end of the eighteenth century to Post-Impressionism. The reputation of the museum is due to five great collections: those of Abraham-Louis-Rodolphe Ducros (1748–1810), Charles Gleyre (1806–1874), Théophile-Alexandre Steinlen (1859–1923), Félix Vallotton (1865–1925) and Louis Soutter (1871–1942).

Modern and contemporary art collections includes works by Marcel Broodthaers, Rolf Iseli, Tadeusz Kantor, Charles Rollier, Daniel Spoerri or Maria Elena Vieira da Silva. Expressive figuration is extensively represented by Günter Brus, Luciano Castelli, Miriam Cahn, Martin Disler, Leiko Ikemura, Arnulf Rainer, Klaudia Schifferle, and Jean-Frédéric Schnyder, among others.

In the years 1990–2010, the museum focused on the acquisition of majors works by international artists such as Christian Boltanski, Tom Burr, Sophie Calle, Alfredo Jaar, Nalini Malani, Bruce Nauman and Jim Shaw, as well as representing local artists such as Jean-Luc Manz, Edmond Jean de Pury, Alain Huck, Silvie Defraoui, Didier Rittener, Denis Savary and Anne-Julie Raccoursier.

In October 2019, the museum relocated to the new ''Plateforme 10'' facility. This expanded facility allows the museum to further dedicate rooms for its permanent collection.

== Gallery ==
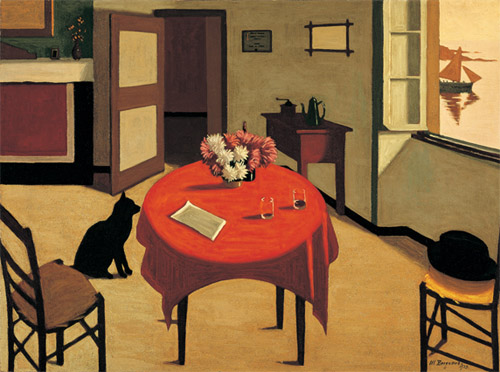
Intérieur aux deux verres by Marius Borgeaud (1923)

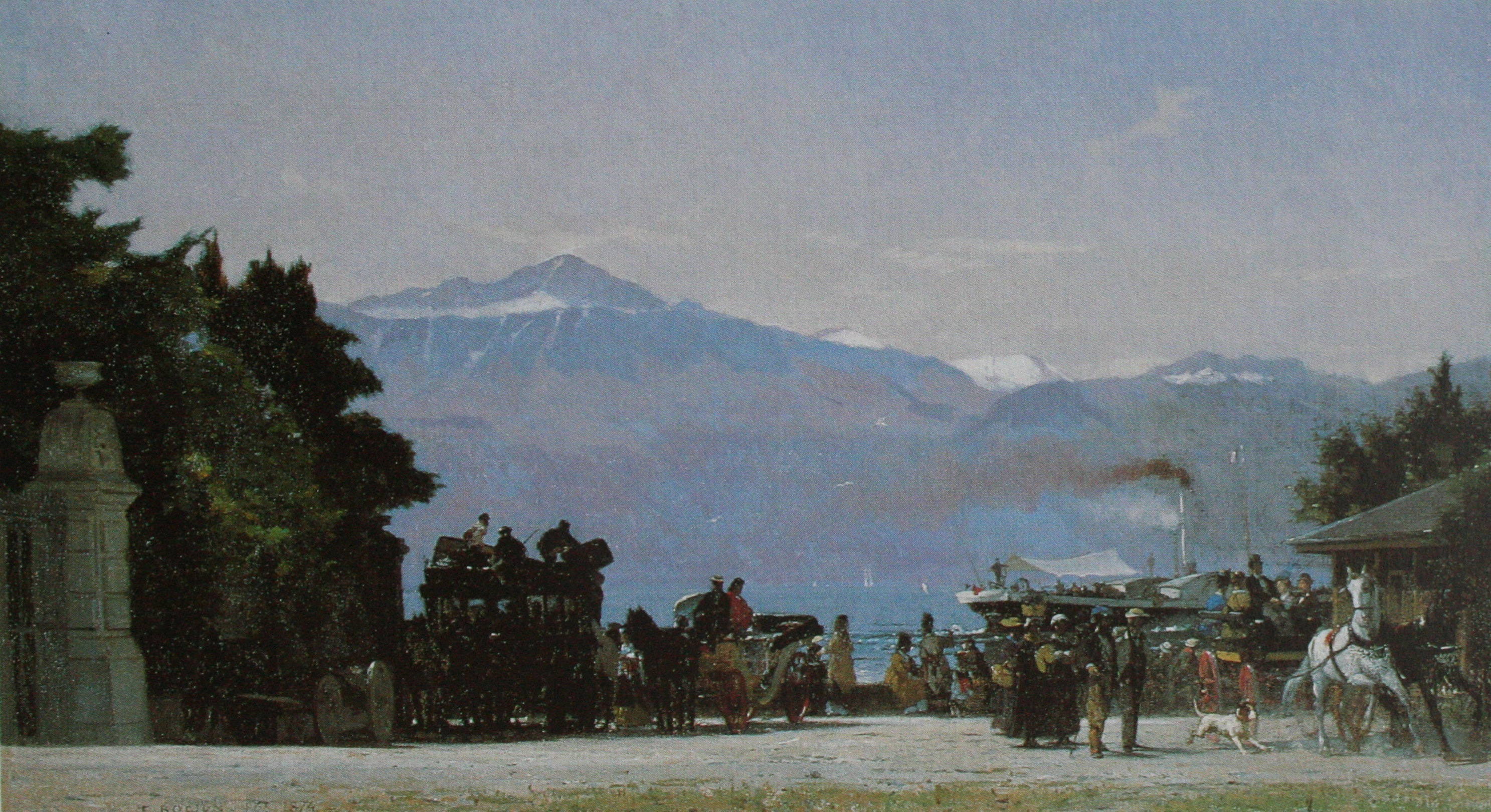
À Ouchy by François Bocion (1874)

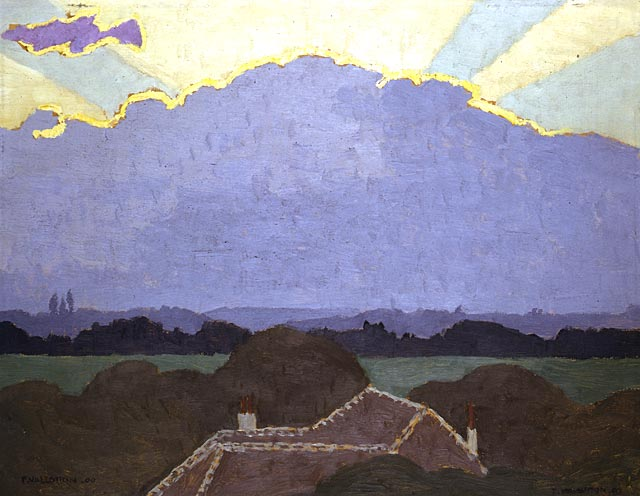
Nuage à Romanel by Félix Vallotton (1900)

== See also ==
- List of art museums
- List of museums in Switzerland
