= Science fiction libraries and museums =

With the growth of science fiction studies as an academic discipline as well as a popular media genre, a number of libraries, museums, archives, and special collections have been established to collect and organize works of scholarly and historical value in the field.

== Key collections ==
The Merril Collection of Science Fiction, Fantasy, and Speculation is a leading collection of science fiction. It was founded in Toronto in 1970 by Judith Merril. This public library collection contains over 63,000 items, including books, magazines, audiovisual works, original manuscripts, and other items of interest to both casual users and academic researchers.

Paul Allen and Jody Patton founded the Science Fiction Museum and Hall of Fame in 2004, located at the base of Space Needle in Seattle. Prominent authors such as Greg Bear serve as advisers to the museum.

An important museum of the genre is Maison d’Ailleurs ("House of Elsewhere") in Yverdon-les-Bains, Switzerland, housing a large collection of literature relating to science fiction, utopias, and extraordinary journeys. It was founded by the French encyclopedist Pierre Versins in 1976 and now owns over 70,000 books, as well as many other items (60,000) related to science fiction and its imagery.

== List of archives, libraries, museums, and collections ==
=== Research collections ===
- Jack Williamson Science Fiction Library lending library of over 20,000 volumes of speculative fiction at Eastern New Mexico University. Includes archival materials from authors.
- J. Lloyd Eaton Collection of Science Fiction, Fantasy, Horror, and Utopian Literature, University of California, Riverside
- The Science Fiction Foundation Collection, Special Collections and Archives, Sydney Jones Library, University of Liverpool
- M. Horvat Collection of Science Fiction Fanzines, University of Iowa Libraries, Special Collections Dept.
- H.G Wells Literary Papers at The Rare Book & Manuscript Library (University of Illinois at Urbana-Champaign)
- The Judith Merril Collection of Science Fiction, Speculation and Fantasy, Toronto Public Library (founded 1970)
- Michigan State University Libraries, Science Fiction Collection; includes collection of Tiptree Award, Clarion archives, and Science Fiction Writers of America depository
- MIT Science Fiction Society ("the world's largest open-shelf collection of science fiction"); local index
- Caltech S.P.E.C.T.R.E. lending library of over 12,000 volumes of speculative fiction at the California Institute of Technology
- Paskow Science Fiction Collection, Temple University Libraries (Philadelphia, Pennsylvania), including a significant collection of fanzines
- University of Maryland Baltimore County, ca. 10,000 book volumes and serials, and the Coslet Collection of 15,000 SF fanzines
- Maison d’Ailleurs ("House of Elsewhere"), Yverdon-les-Bains, Switzerland (founded 1976 and holding more than 40,000 books and other items)
- Science Fiction and Fantasy Writers of America Collection Northern Illinois University. Science Fiction Writers of America depository, pulps, and collects the papers of current SF authors.
- University of Delaware's Special Collections, including the "Roland Bounds Science Fiction Collection" (30,000 volumes)
- Georgia Tech Science Fiction Collection at the Georgia Institute of Technology (established 1999; 20,000+ volumes)
- Texas A&M University's "Science Fiction and Fantasy Research Collection" (More than 20,000 titles and "over ninety percent of the American science fiction pulp magazines published prior to 1980")
- San Diego State University's "Elizabeth Chater Collection of Science Fiction and Fantasy"
- Seoul Science Fiction & Fantasy Library
- Science Fiction Collections at the University of South Florida
- Science Fiction Collections at the Kenneth Spencer Research Library, University of Kansas
- Phantastische Bibliothek Wetzlar, Germany (270,000 volumes of speculative fiction, mainly in German, including a significant collection of pulp magazines and fanzines)
- Villa Fantastica, Vienna, Austria public library founded 2010 by de:Helmuth W. Mommers, holding 50,000 volumes mainly in German, including a broad collection of German "Dime Novels"
- University of Oslo Science Library (8,000 volumes of science fiction as of 2017)
- Murdoch University Science Fiction Collection (including over 13,000 book titles and a significant number of fanzines)
- J. Francis McComas Science Fiction Collection, San Francisco Public Library
- The University of Alabama in Huntsville Special Collections and Archives collects science fiction in English and German and has archival collections from Willy Ley and Robert Forward.
- City Tech Science Fiction Collection, Ursula C. Schwerin Library, New York City College of Technology
- The University of Calgary Bob Gibson Collection of Speculative Fiction is a collection of 28,000 hardcover books, paperbacks, pulp magazines and other materials collected by the late Bob (William Robert) Gibson and donated by his son Andrew. These items can be viewed in the archive and portions of the collection have been digitized.

Popular culture collections with strong SF

- Browne Popular Culture Library at Bowling Green State University
- Dime Novel and Story Paper Collection, Stanford University Library ("Dime Novels and Penny Dreadfuls")

=== Museums ===
- Science Fiction Museum and Hall of Fame, Seattle, Washington, founded in 2004.
- Maison d’Ailleurs ("House of Elsewhere"), Yverdon-les-Bains, Switzerland (founded 1976 and holding more than 70,000 books and 60,000 other items)
- Museum of Science Fiction, Washington, DC, founded in 2013 with a goal of becoming the world's first comprehensive science fiction museum.

=== Important databases and portals ===
- SF Hub, the University of Liverpool Library's "Science Fiction Foundation" collection
- Science Fiction & Fantasy Research Database, Texas A&M University, College Station; A freely available online resource (more than 145,000 items) designed to help students and researchers locate secondary sources for the study of the science fiction and fantasy and associated genres; these include: historical material; books; articles; news reports; interviews; film reviews; commentary; and fan writing.
- Center for the Study of Science Fiction, University of Kansas
- ISFDB, the Internet Speculative Fiction DataBase
- Locus Index to Science Fiction (1984-1999)
- Map of major SF Archival Collections maintained by The Eaton Journal of Archival Research in Science Fiction
- SF Archival Collections Wiki, a growing wiki of the locations of SF writers' papers, crowd-sourced by librarians.
