= Bruno della Chiesa =

Italian-French-German linguist

Bruno della Chiesa (born 7 July 1962) is a linguist of Italian, French and German descent, who describes himself as an "engaged cosmopolitan". He teaches at Harvard University and is considered one of the main founders of educational neuroscience, is known to have coined the terms "neuromyth" (2002) and "neuro-hijacking" (2013) and has established theories on the "motivational vortex" (2007) and on the “tesseracts in the brain” (2008). He also created the international science fiction festival Utopiales.

== Education ==
In the 1980s, after a first cycle of studies in linguistics, literature and Germanic philosophy in Nancy (France) and Bonn (Germany), he undertook his postgraduate studies in language didactics with Robert Galisson at the University of Paris III: Sorbonne Nouvelle where he touched upon sociolinguistics and worked with Louis Porcher on cultural anthropology and the sociology of education. Deeply influenced by the works of Pierre Bourdieu, Tzvetan Todorov and Noam Chomsky, whom he worked with subsequently, he developed a growing interest for philosophy of language, often referring to Bertrand Russell and Ludwig Wittgenstein amongst his principal influences.

== Professional life ==
=== Between "cultural diplomacy", teaching and research ===
Between 1985 and 1999, Bruno della Chiesa worked on several continents for the French Ministry of Foreign Affairs. In Cairo, Egypt (1985-1987), he taught French literature and philosophy; in Mexico (1987-1990), as the coordinator of the French department within the University of Guadalajara, he created initial training and continuing education programs for French lecturers of the seven universities in the west of the country; in Austria (1990-1994), he directed the Institut français of Graz; at the end of 1994, he came back to France on invitation of the then President of the Senate René Monory, to manage the international relations of the French département Vienne.

=== OECD ===
In the beginning of 1999, he joined the Centre for Educational Research and Innovation (CERI) at the OECD as a senior analyst (project manager). His project "Learning Sciences and Brain Research" (1999-2008), launched under the impulsion of Jarl Bengtsson, brought together over 300 experts from 26 countries and has led to the emergence of initiatives developing the transdisciplinary approach of "educational neuroscience", first in North America, Asia and Europe, and finally all over the world. During this time he started to work with Kurt Fischer and Howard Gardner at Harvard University. From 2007 to 2012, without abandoning neuroscience, he developed - between Cambridge (Massachusetts, USA), Ulm (Germany) and Paris (France) -, a controversial project on languages and cultures in an age of globalization. Numerous important divergences of philosophical nature concerning the objectives and orientations of this project, as well as on internal politics and structures, led to his leaving the Organisation in 2012.

=== Harvard ===
In 2007, Bruno della Chiesa was invited to the Harvard University Graduate School of Education, and since 2008 teaches a yearly course there entitled “Learning in a Globalizing World: Language Acquisition, Cultural Awareness, and Cognitive Justice” within the International Education Policy and Mind, Brain and Education programs, as well as different seminars throughout the year. Interested in neuro-ethics (foremost in the sense of ‘the development of ethical judgments and decisions in the brain’), in 2009 he became the editor of the section "Addressing Educational Neuroscience and Ethics: Implications for Societies" ("AENEIS") in the Mind, Brain and Education journal, as well as a member of the International Mind, Brain, and Education Society (IMBES).

From 2012, alarmed by the multiplication of various questionable (or even fraudulent) forms of (mis-)use of the neurosciences in the education sector, Bruno della Chiesa regularly vehemently criticizes the disputable maneuvers of those he calls, depending on the case, “neuro-charlatans”, “neuro-zealots”, “neuro-hijackers” or “neuro-traffickers”.

As the focus of his research is however more and more turned towards the challenges and opportunities that globalization poses for contemporary societies and the education systems they generate (see his transdisciplinary theory on “tesseracts in the brain”, first presented in 2008 and continuously developed further). Within this system of projects developed at Harvard, and whose network has started to take a global dimension in the past years, he is currently working across all continents, with a particular focus on the special and in various aspects exemplary case of Singapore. In the framework of his research during the last fifteen years, he has given over a hundred talks in four languages at conferences in forty countries.

== Science fiction ==
Bruno della Chiesa has been an avid reader of science fiction since childhood and continues to read fiction with philosophical content regularly. In the early 1990s, he taught European science fiction literature at the University of Graz (Austria). At the end of 1995, he began working on the international science fiction festival, which three years later became ‘Utopia’, at the Futuroscope. The festival was relocated to Nantes in 2000 and renamed ‘Utopiales’ in 2001 when Bruno della Chiesa handed over the artistic direction to Patrick Gyger. Linked to this annual event, between 2000 and 2006 he published under the title “Utopiæ", 7 anthologies containing short stories by 70 science fiction authors from 40 countries and writing in 20 different languages. He also wrote approximately 50 literary critiques in the magazine Galaxies, most of which are available online at NooSFere.

== Selected bibliography ==
=== Books as editor, co-ordinator and author ===
- B. della Chiesa, J. Scott & C. Hinton (Eds.) (2012), Languages in a Global World. Learning for Better Cultural Understanding. Paris: OECD.
- B. della Chiesa et al. (Eds.) (2007), Understanding the Brain – The Birth of a Learning Science (also available in Arabic, Chinese, French, Japanese, Serbian and Spanish). Paris: OECD.
- B. della Chiesa et al. (Eds.) (2002), Understanding the Brain – Towards a New Learning Science (also available in Chinese, French, German, Japanese, Portuguese and Spanish). Paris: OECD.
- B. della Chiesa et al. (Eds.) (2002): Los Desafíos de las Tecnologías de la Información y las Comunicaciones en la Educación. Madrid: Spanish Ministry of Education, Culture and Sport.
- Bund-Länder-Kommission für Bildungsplanung und Forschungsförderung; Österreich. Bundesministerium für Bildung, Wissenschaft und Kultur; Schweizerische Konferenz der Kantonalen Erziehungsdirektoren (2002) (Eds.): Lernen in der Wissensgesellschaft. Innsbruck: Studien Verlag.

=== Recent Articles ===
- della Chiesa, B. (2014). Switch on Brain with Science. IB World Magazine, 69(March ), 20-21.
- della Chiesa, B. (2013). Our Learning/Teaching Brains: What can be Expected from Neuroscience, and how? What should not be Expected from Neuroscience, and why? Proceedings of the 2013 Research Conference. How the Brain Learns: What lessons are there for teaching? (pp. 3–6). Melbourne: Australian Council for Educational Research.
- della Chiesa, B. (2013). De la perfectibilité humaine, des neurosciences, de la libération, et des pommes de terre. In P. Toscani (Ed.), Les neurosciences au cœur de la classe (pp. 14–17). Lyon: Chronique sociale.
- della Chiesa, B. (2013). Mieux comprendre le développement de l’enfant : ce que l’on peut et ne peut pas attendre des neurosciences. Paper presented at the Bien-être des jeunes enfants dans l’accueil et l’éducation en France et ailleurs, Actes du colloque des 10 et 11 octobre 2011 (pp. 25–29), Paris: Centre d’analyse stratégique, DREES, Ministère de la Santé.
- della Chiesa, B. (2012). Retour sur bilinguisme, multilinguisme et éducation. Les Vendredis Intellos, Interview by Ilse Dethune, from http://lesvendredisintellos.com/2012/02/23/retour-sur-bilinguisme-multilinguisme-et-education-guest/
- della Chiesa, B. (2012): "Expansion of our own being": Language learning, cultural belonging and global awareness. In B. della Chiesa, J. Scott & C. Hinton (Eds.), Languages in a Global World. Learning for Better Cultural Understanding. Paris: OECD, 437-461
- della Chiesa, B. (2012): Learning languages in a globalising world. In B. della Chiesa, J. Scott & C. Hinton (Eds.), Languages in a Global World. Learning for Better Cultural Understanding. Paris: OECD, 37-51
- della Chiesa, B. (2011), When Learning Languages, Motivation Matters Most. Interview by Nancy Walser, Harvard Education Letter 27/6, Nov.-Dec. 2011, Cambridge, MA: Harvard Education Press, pp. 6–8.
- Stein, Z., della Chiesa, B. Hinton, Ch., Fischer, K. (2011), Ethical Issues in Educational Neuroscience: Raising Children in a Brave New World. In J. Illes & B.J. Sahakian (Eds.), Oxford Handbook of Neuroethics. New York: Oxford University Press, 803-822
- della Chiesa, B. (2010), Wanted: Tesseract – One Hypothesis on Languages, Cultures, and Ethics for Mind, Brain, and Education. Mind, Brain and Education, 4(3) September 2010, New York: Blackwell Publishing, 135-148.
- della Chiesa, B. (2010), ‘‘Fácilis descensus Averni’’ - Mind, Brain, Education, and Ethics: Highway to Hell, Stairway to Heaven, or Passing Dead-End? Mind, Brain and Education, 4(2) June 2010, New York: Blackwell Publishing, 45-48.
- della Chiesa, B. (2010). ‘‘Wer fremde Sprachen nicht kennt…’’ (pp. 9-29). In: Die Bedeutung der Sprache – Bildungspolitische Konsequenzen und Maßnahmen. Berlin: Berliner Wissenschaftsverlag.
- della Chiesa, B. (2010). Gute Gehirne gesucht! Von Neurowissenschaften, Lernen, Lehren, Medien, und Ethik (pp. 9-28). In: LERNtheoriEN - Protokoll 15/10. Rehburg-Loccum: Akademie Loccum.
- Rolbin, C. & della Chiesa, B. (2010), “We Share the Same Biology...” - Cultivating Cross-Cultural Empathy and Global Ethics through Plurilingualism. Mind, Brain and Education, 4(4) December 2010, New York: Blackwell Publishing, 197-208.
- della Chiesa, B. (2009), Beginning in the brain: Pioneering the field of educational neuroscience. Usable Knowledge, Harvard Graduate School of Education, Cambridge MA, March 2009. http://www.uknow.gse.harvard.edu/learning/LD322.htm
- della Chiesa, B. (2009), Beginning in the brain: Pioneering the field of educational neuroscience. Usable Knowledge, Harvard Graduate School of Education, Cambridge MA, March 2009.
- della Chiesa, B. (2009), Ce qu’on sait sur la mémoire... et tout ce qui reste à apprendre. Cahiers Pédagogiques, n°474 ‘Aider à mémoriser’, Paris, 28-31.
- della Chiesa, B., Christoph, V. & Hinton, Ch. (2009), How Many Brains Does It Take to Build a New Light: Knowledge Management Challenges of a Transdisciplinary Project. Mind, Brain and Education, 3(1) March 2009, New York: Blackwell Publishing, 17-26.
- della Chiesa, B. & Christoph, V. (2009). Neurociencia y docentes: crónica de un encuentro. Cuadernos de pedagogía, vol. 386, Madrid, January 2009, 92-96.
- della Chiesa, B. (2008), Long Live Lifelong Brain Plasticity! Lifelong Learning in Europe (LLinE), Helsinki, 2008, 13 (2), 78-85.
- della Chiesa, B. (2008), « Introduction », Éducation, sciences cognitive et neurosciences, sous l’égide de l’Académie des Sciences (pp. 7–12 & 20; et commentaires: pp. 83–212). Paris: Presses Universitaires de France
- della Chiesa, B. & Miyamoto, K. (2008), Unlocking the secrets of mankind's most powerful machine, Glasgow: Teaching Scotland, Spring 2008, 14-15.
- Hinton, Ch., Miyamoto, K., & della Chiesa, B. (2008), Brain Research, Learning and Emotions: implications for education research, policy and practice. European Journal of Education, 43(1), 2008, London: Blackwell Publishing, 87-103.

=== Online Material ===
- Hinton, C., della Chiesa, B., Christoph, V., & Francis, H. (2014). Online Course: Brain and Learning. https://web.archive.org/web/20150518144552/http://www.neafoundation.org/pages/courses/: The NEA Foundation.
- Chomsky, N., Gardner, H., & della Chiesa, B. (2013). Pedagogy of the Oppressed. Askwith Forum: https://www.youtube.com/watch?v=2Ll6M0cXV54.
