= Maison d'Ailleurs =

Coordinates: 46.7787°N 6.642°E

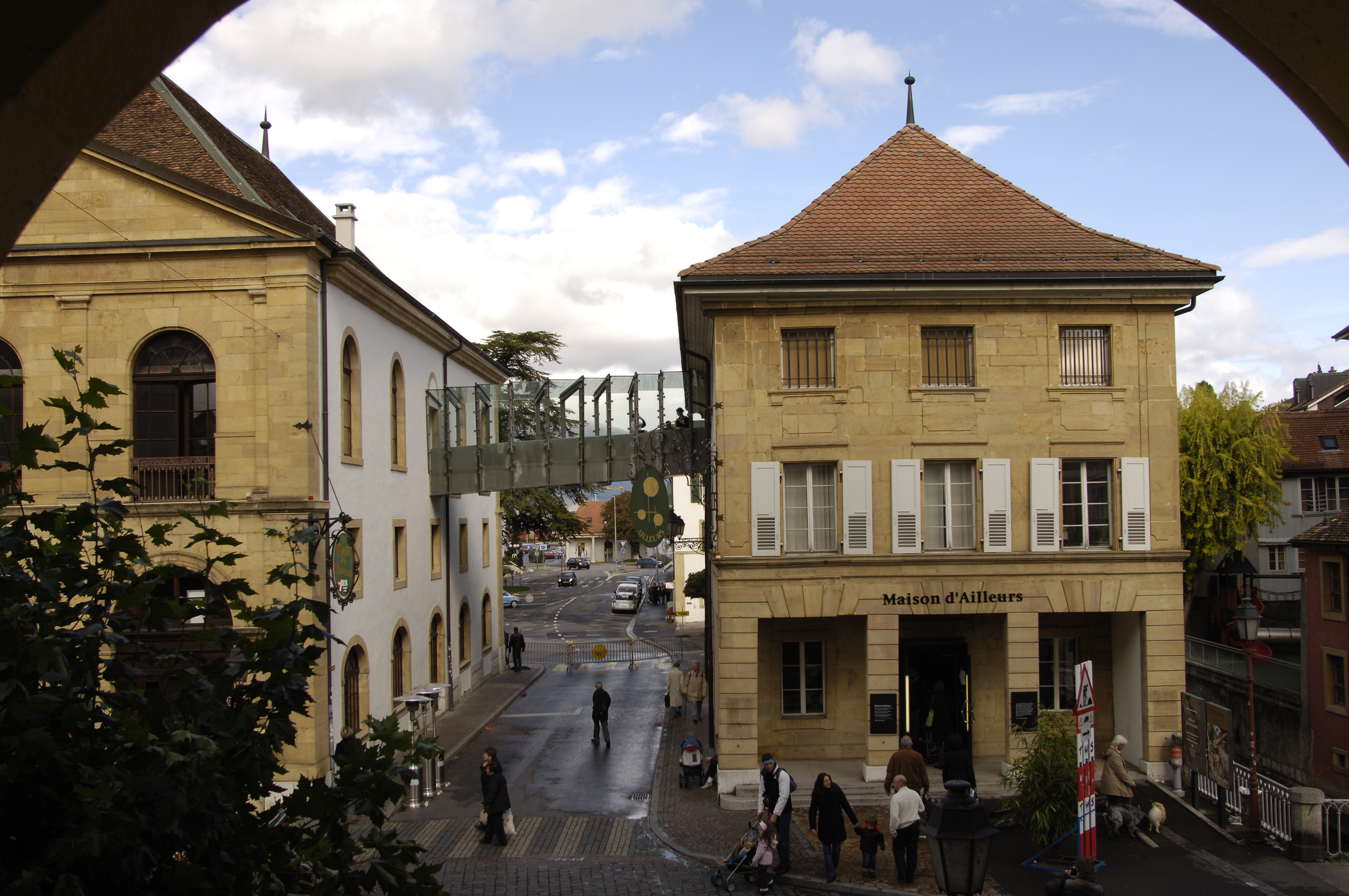
The Maison d'Ailleurs in Yverdon-les-Bains

The Maison d'Ailleurs (translated as "House of Elsewhere") is a museum of science fiction, utopia and extraordinary journeys in Yverdon-les-Bains (Switzerland). It is a non-profit foundation functioning both as a public museum and a specialized research center.

The archives of the museum contain around 70,000 documents related to science fiction or utopia (books, art pieces, toys, etc.), including some very old (as early as the sixteenth century) or unique pieces. The collections of the museum are used for iconographic purposes or research (literature, history of ideas, design, etc.). The Maison d'Ailleurs thus represents an important research and documentation center.

In parallel, the museum presents from two to three temporary exhibitions per year, around the main themes of science fiction (cities of the future, space travel, lost worlds, etc.) and its artists: H. R. Giger, John Howe, James Gurney, Caza, Jean Fontaine, etc. The exhibitions favour diversity and openness towards the world, in order to reach a broad audience. The museum also offers itinerary exhibitions and regularly presents its work in Switzerland and abroad. Half a dozen exhibitions are rented per year on average.

The Maison d'Ailleurs is the only public institution of its kind in the world. It has the status of a non-profit foundation, and therefore isn't directly a communal museum. The Foundation manages the collections owned by the city of Yverdon-les-Bains in the building it has been provided with. Five to seven members of the Foundation board are chosen by the municipality of Yverdon-les-Bains, while two others come from the association Amis de la Maison d'Ailleurs ("Friends of the House of Elsewhere").

== History ==
The Maison d'Ailleurs originates from the work of the French encyclopedian Pierre Versins, who dedicated his life to writing and the study of what he named "rational romanesque conjectures" (conjectures romanesques rationnelles in French). For more than twenty years, he gathered a very important collection of science fiction works. Based on this corpus, he wrote one of the major books in this domain, the Encyclopédie de l'utopie, des voyages extraordinaires et de la science-fiction. In 1976, he donated his assets to the city of Yverdon-les-Bains and the Maison d'Ailleurs was created. Pierre Versins acted as its curator until he moved back to France in 1981. Initially, the Maison d'Ailleurs only occupied a three-room flat, and didn't have the ambition of a museum.

After a lethargy period (during which the direction was held by Pascal Ducommun), the municipality of Yverdon-les-Bains decided in 1989 to install the Maison d'Ailleurs in the renovated old prison, a historical building built in 1806 and well-situated in the center of the city. The journalist Roger Gaillard (1947–2010) was chosen as its curator and the new museum opened in 1991.

By the end of 1995, the communal council of Yverdon decided to cut more than 70% of the budget for the next year, which dramatically reduced the organizational slack of the Maison d'Ailleurs and generated a lot of negative reactions. The majority of the staff was dismissed. In 1998, a foundation was created to manage the museum. Its first decision was to give the direction to historian Patrick Gyger, who took over in February 1999.

== Espace Jules Verne ==
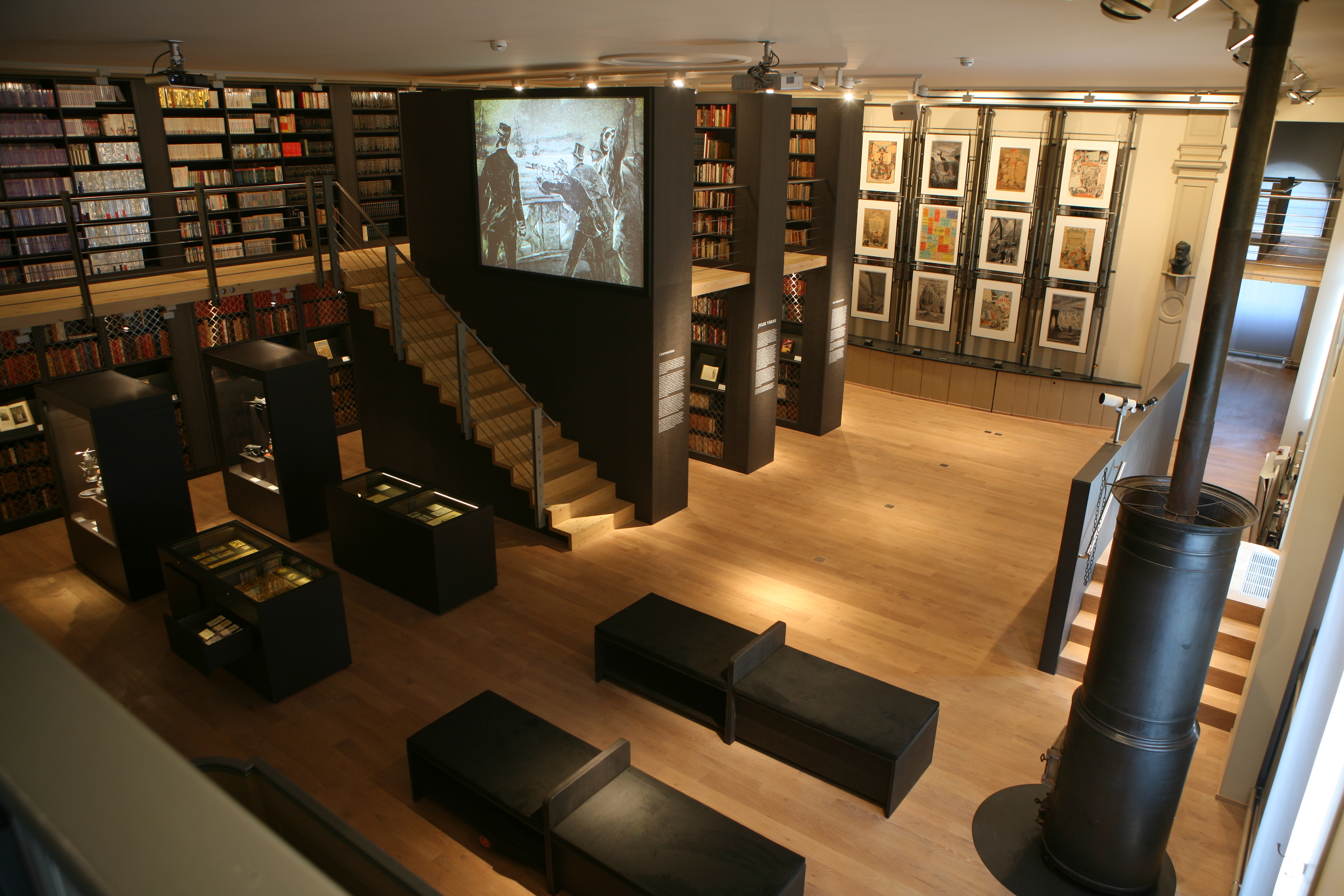
The Jules Verne Exhibition Space

In 2003, collector Jean-Michel Margot decided to donate one of the most important collections dedicated to Jules Verne to the city of Yverdon-les-Bains. The Maison d'Ailleurs was given the task to manage and present this collection.

This Jules Verne collection contains about 20,000 documents, including rare pieces such as posters dating from the end of the nineteenth century, handwritten notes, ancient iconography linked to discovery and scientific adventure, as well as the complete collection of the Voyages Extraordinaires, owned by the granddaughter of Pierre-Jules Hetzel, Jules Verne's publisher.

To host these pieces, a new Espace Jules Verne (Jules Verne Exhibition Space) has been built in the old casino of Yverdon-les-Bains. In addition to the public presentation of the collection, a workspace is reserved to researchers, with a privileged access to documents. The Espace Jules Verne is connected to the rest of the museum by a footbridge.

The administration of the museum and a large collection of pulp magazines have also been moved to the new building. This will allow the creation of a permanent exhibition at the Maison d'Ailleurs, in addition to the temporary exhibitions.

The Espace Jules Verne opened in October 2008.

== Partnerships ==
The Maison d'Ailleurs represents an ever-expanding research and documentation center, which has built a large network of partners over time. The museum collaborates with the European Space Agency (ESA), the University of Lausanne, the Cité de l'Espace in Toulouse (France), the International Trade Event in Bordeaux, the "Utopiales" festival in Nantes (France), the Neuchâtel International Fantastic Film Festival, and it is part of the Science et Cité network in the French-speaking part of Switzerland.

Among its studies, the Maison d'Ailleurs has coordinated an important research funded by the ESA to try to find, in science fiction works, imaginary inventions related to astronautics and space conquest technologies.

In a partnership with the ESA and the Agence Martienne (Martian Agency), the Maison d'Ailleurs has realised the most important science fiction image library in the world. The museum has also been mandated by Pro Helvetia to prepare an important itinerary exhibition project about Swiss artists working in cinema and video games.

== See also ==
- Science fiction libraries and museums
- List of museums in Switzerland
