= Patrick Gyger =

Swiss historian and writer (born 1971)

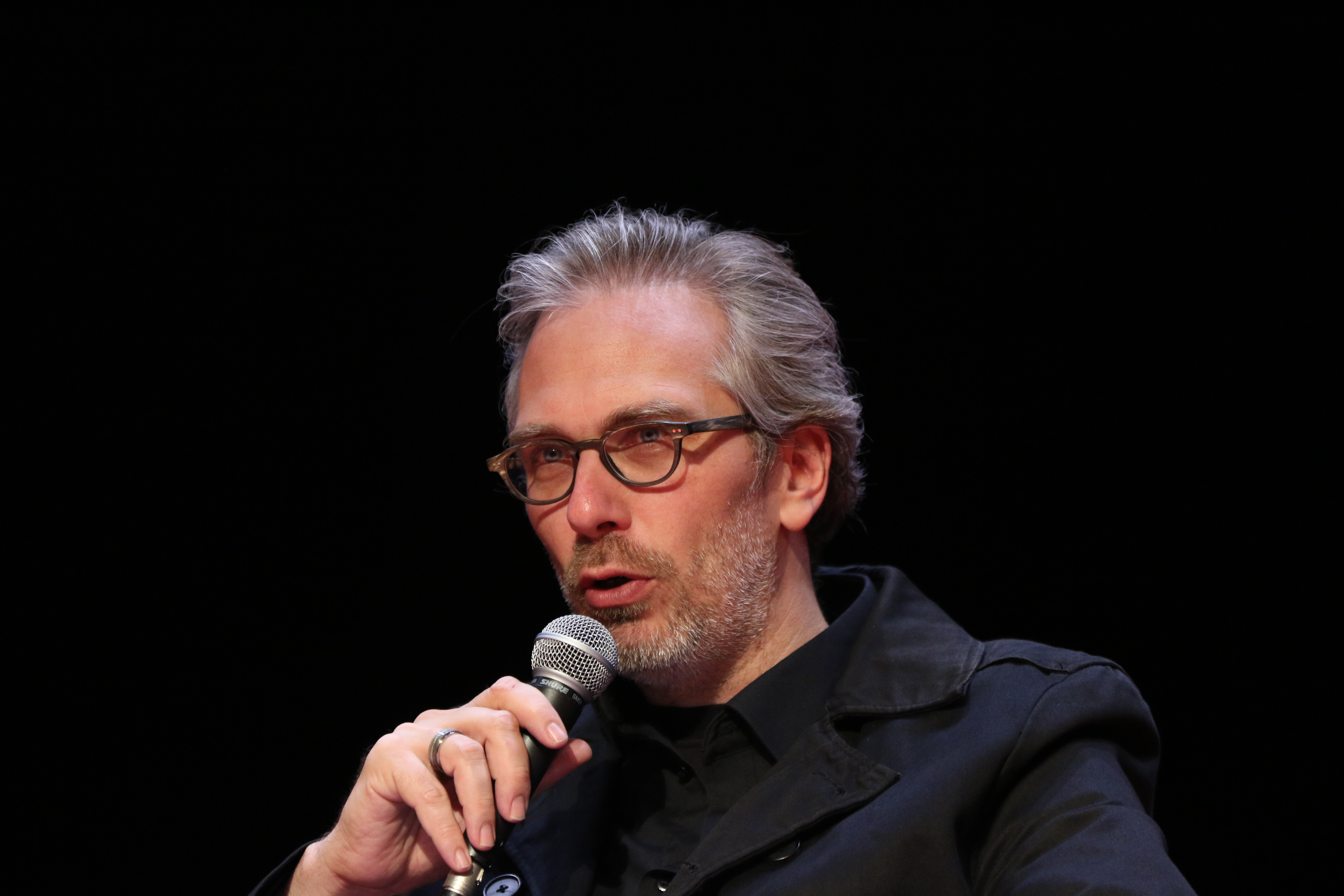
Patrick Gyger in 2015

Patrick J. Gyger (born 1971 in São Paulo) is a Swiss historian and writer. His family left Brazil in 1979 and moved to Rolle in Switzerland. He studied medieval history at the University of Lausanne in 1989.

== Career ==
From 1999 to 2010, Gyger was director of the Maison d'Ailleurs (House of Elsewhere) in Yverdon-les-Bains (Switzerland), a museum housing one of the world's largest collections of literature relating to science fiction, utopia, and extraordinary journeys. In 2008, Gyger opened the Espace Jules Verne, a wing of Maison d'Ailleurs dedicated to Jules Verne. This extension also houses a science fiction pulps collection. Early 21st Century, along with Arthur Woods of O.U.R.S., Gyger was co-manager of the project Innovative Technologies in Science Fiction for Space Applications ITSF, a study conducted by The European Space Agency (ESA). Patrick Gyger was artistic director of the annual Utopiales International Science Fiction Festival in Nantes from 2001 to 2005. Utopiales is the largest European event for science fiction. Writers such as Samuel R. Delany, Brian Aldiss, James Morrow, K.W. Jeter, David Brin, Robert Holdstock, Christopher Priest, Terry Bisson, Norman Spinrad. Jeffrey Ford, Lucius Shepard.

In January 2011, Gyger was appointed director of le lieu unique in Nantes, a venue dedicated to contemporary and performing arts. It houses several exhibition and performance spaces, a restaurant, a bookstore, a hammam, a bar/club, a kindergarten, etc. Gyger stated that the concept of utopia was a guideline of his programme.

2014, the Swiss Federal Council appointed him Honorary Consul of Switzerland in Nantes.

In 2017, Gyger curated the touring festival-style exhibition Into the Unknown: a Journey through Science Fiction, produced by the Barbican Centre in London.

Since January 2021, Patrick Gyger acts as general director of the Plateforme 10 foundation in Lausanne. Plateforme 10's main mission is to manage and foster three cantonal museums, the Cantonal Museum of Fine Arts MCBA, the Museum of Contemporary Design and Applied Arts, and Photo Elysée. Gyger is also a board member for several organizations, including École Polytechnique Fédérale de Lausanne (EPFL Pavilions, a venue for art and science in society), CERN (culture board), and the National Choreography Center in La Rochelle.

== Personal life ==
On New Year's Day 2011, he was married to Honor Harger at the Port Chalmers Town Hall in New Zealand. Harger later remarried. Gyger is the father to a daughter (b. 2016). After many years abroad, Gyger moved to Lausanne in January 2021.

== Awards ==
- As the director of the museum, Gyger was Guest of Honour at Eurocon 2004.
- Gyger was nominated as one of the 100 most influential people in Western Switzerland (L'Hebdo, 2006)
- Gyger received the "Grand Prix de l'Imaginaire" in France twice (2001 and 2010) for his work at Maison d'Ailleurs.
- In 2017, Gyger was made a Knight in the Order of Arts and Letters (France)

== Bibliography ==
- Gyger, Patrick (1998). L'Épée Et La Corde: Criminalité Et Justice À Fribourg (1475-1505). Section d'histoire médiévale, Faculté des lettres, University of Lausanne. ISBN 2940110123.
- Gyger, Patrick (2001). "A Few Thoughts about Ideas and Images in Science Fiction". Innovative Technologies from Science Fiction for Space Applications. European Space Agency. OCLC 60500585. ESA BR-176. Archived from the original on 2013-01-27.
- Gyger, Patrick, ed. (2003). Îles sur le toit du monde: une anthologie romande de science-fiction [Islands on the top of the world: an anthology of French science fiction]. Archipel.
- Gyger, Patrick (2005). Les voitures volantes : Souvenirs d'un futur rêvé [Flying cars: memories of a perfect future]. ISBN 2828908429.
- Gyger, Patrick; Valery, Francis (2011). Flying Cars: The Extraordinary History of Cars Designed for Tomorrow's World. Haynes Publishing. ISBN 978-0857330918.
- Patrick Gyger, Into the Unknown. A Journey Through Science Fiction, exhinition catalgoue, Barbican London, 2017.
