= François Bocion =

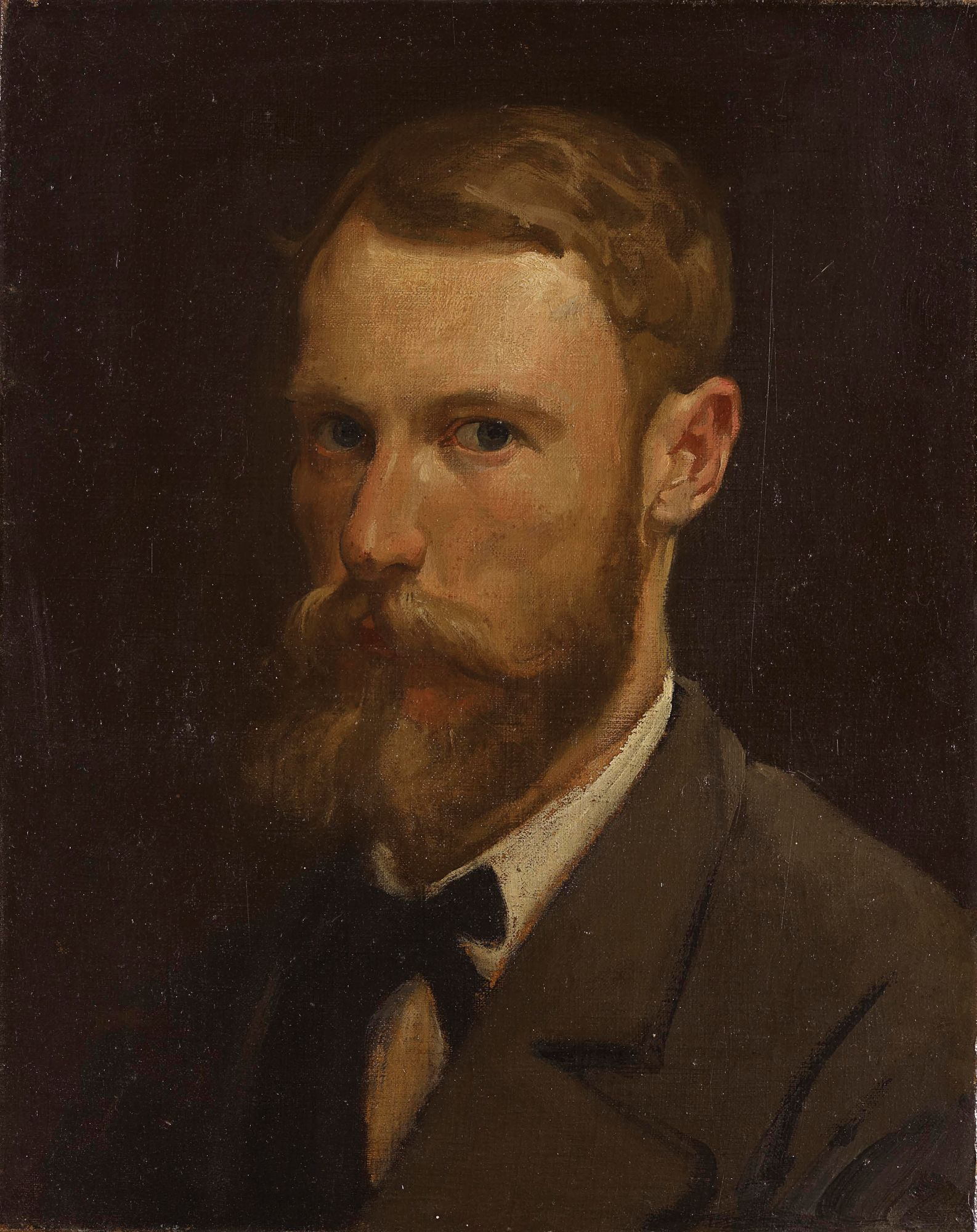
Self-portrait (1868)

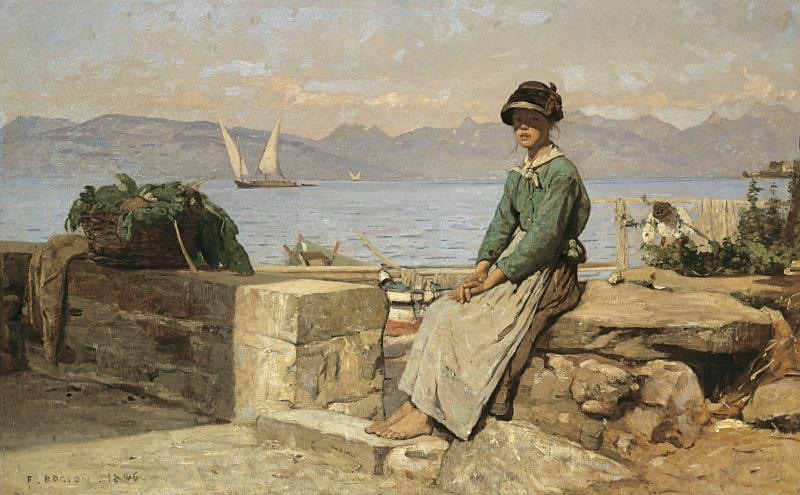
Young Woman at the Lake Shore

François-Louis David Bocion (French pronunciation: [fʁɑ̃swa lwi david bɔsjɔ̃]; 30 March 1828 – 12 December 1890) was a Swiss painter, designer and art professor, known primarily for his landscapes of the area around Lake Geneva.

== Biography ==
He was born in Lausanne as the youngest of five children born to the carpenter Henri-Louis Bocion (1792–1835), who was originally from Bournens, and his wife, Suzanne-Catherine. After his father's death, the family's financial situation became untenable and he was placed with his paternal grandfather, a marble sculptor, in Montreux. His grandfather, in turn, died in 1840 and François went to live with his mother's family in Vevey, where he completed his primary education.

During those years, he was introduced to drawing by Christian-Gottlieb Steinlen (1779–1847) and François Bonnet (1811–1894). This inspired him to visit Paris in 1846, where he frequented the studios of Louis-Aimé Grosclaude and Charles Gleyre at the École des Beaux-arts. He also made friends with Gustave Courbet. After a bout with typhoid fever, he returned to Lausanne.

He held his first showing with the "Société des beaux-arts" (Turnus), shortly thereafter. From 1849 until his death, he was a Professor of Drawing at the École industrielle de Lausanne and designed the school's student uniform. He was a regular contributor of cartoons to the satirical journal, La Guêpe (The Wasp) from 1851 to 1854. Until 1858, he made numerous trips to Italy. His painting of Venice was purchased by the Canton of Vaud and hangs in the meeting room of the Council of State. He also took private students, notably Théophile Steinlen and Eugène Grasset.

In 1859, he married Anna-Barbara Furrer. They had nine children, five of whom died in infancy.

After 1888, he was a member of the Commission fédérale des beaux-arts. His works may be seen at the Musée historique Lausanne, the Cantonal Museum of Fine Arts and the Musée des Beaux-Arts de Strasbourg. A pedestrian passage in Lausanne was named after him in 1924.
