= Louis-Aimé Grosclaude =

Swiss painter (1784–1869)

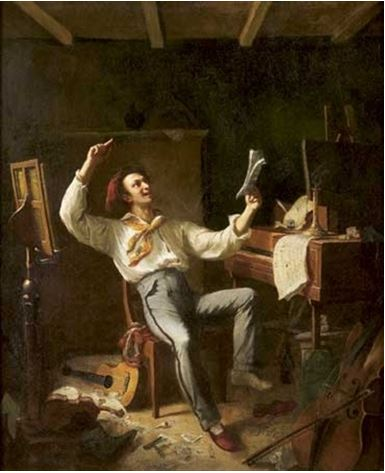
Inspiration

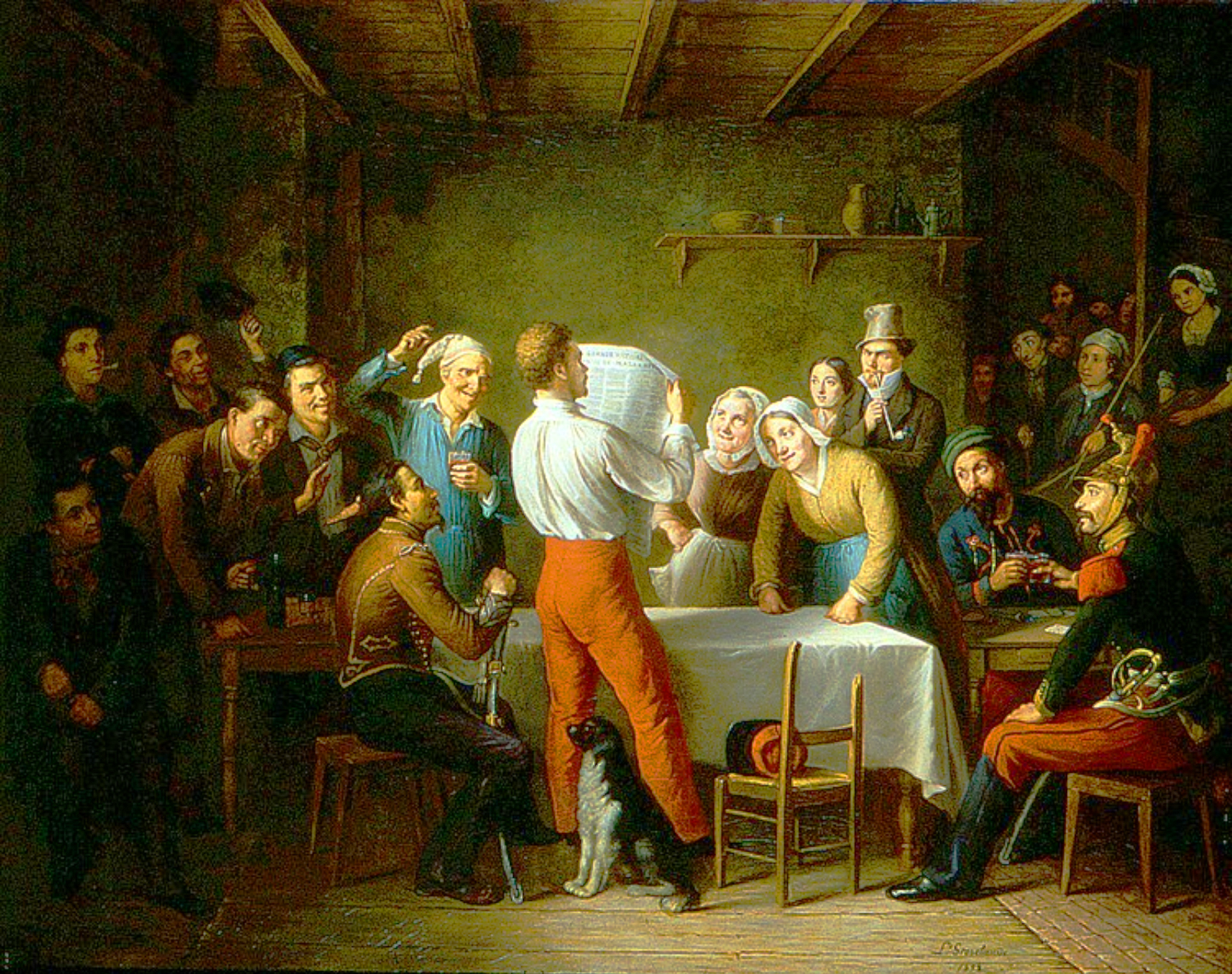
A bulletin from the French Army, announcing victory in the Battle of Malakoff

Louis-Aimé Grosclaude (26 September 1784, Le Locle - 11 December 1869, Paris) was a Swiss painter who began as a portrait painter, then specialized in genre and historical scenes.

== Biography ==
Louis-Aimé Grosclaude served as an apprenticeship with his father, Abraham-Louis Grosclaude, an engraver and watchmaker, but practiced drawing in his spare time. From 1803 to 1805, he trained in Geneva with a Dutch painter, whose name has not been recorded. He then spent two years in Paris, where he studied at the École des Beaux-Arts and took a position in the studios of Jean-Baptiste Regnault, who encouraged him to compete in the Prix de Rome. Illness from overwork prevented him from doing so, however, and he found it necessary to seek treatment at home twice during those years.

Upon returning to Geneva, he set up as a portrait painter and gained a considerable reputation as such, but decided that he preferred to paint genre scenes. In 1824, he married the painter, Jeanne Pernette Jourdan. In 1831, they had a son, Louis-Frédéric, who became a portrait painter.

Being financially independent, he did not exhibit at the Salon until 1827. After moving to Paris, in 1835, he obtained a third-class medal there, then a second-class medal in 1838 and, finally, a first-class medal in 1845. After that point, he turned from genre painting to religious and historical subjects. During these years, he divided his time between Paris and Neuchâtel, where he once again painted some portraits.

He also took students, including Fritz Zuber-Buhler and François Bocion, and was his son's first teacher. Baron James Mayer de Rothschild commissioned several works from him.

He had many admirers in Prussia, including King Frederick William III, and he was named an honorary member of the Prussian Academy of Arts in 1826.

His son completed some paintings that he was unable to finish, due to illness. His reputation diminished rapidly after his death.

== Sources ==
- "Grosclaude, Louis-Aimé". SIKART Lexicon on art in Switzerland.
- Biographical notes @ the Dictionnaire historique de la Suisse
- Émile Bellier de La Chavignerie, Louis Auvray, Dictionnaire général des artistes de l'École française depuis l'origine des arts du dessin jusqu'à nos jours : architectes, peintres, sculpteurs, graveurs et lithographes, Vol.1, Librairie Renouard, Paris, 1882 Gallica
- Pascal Ruedin, Beaux-arts et représentation Nationale: La participation des artistes suisses aux expositions universelles de Paris (1855-1900), p. 95, 130, Peter Lang S.A. Éditions suisses internationales, Berne, 2010 ISBN 978-3-03430-041-4 Google Books
