= Antoine-Louis Romanet =

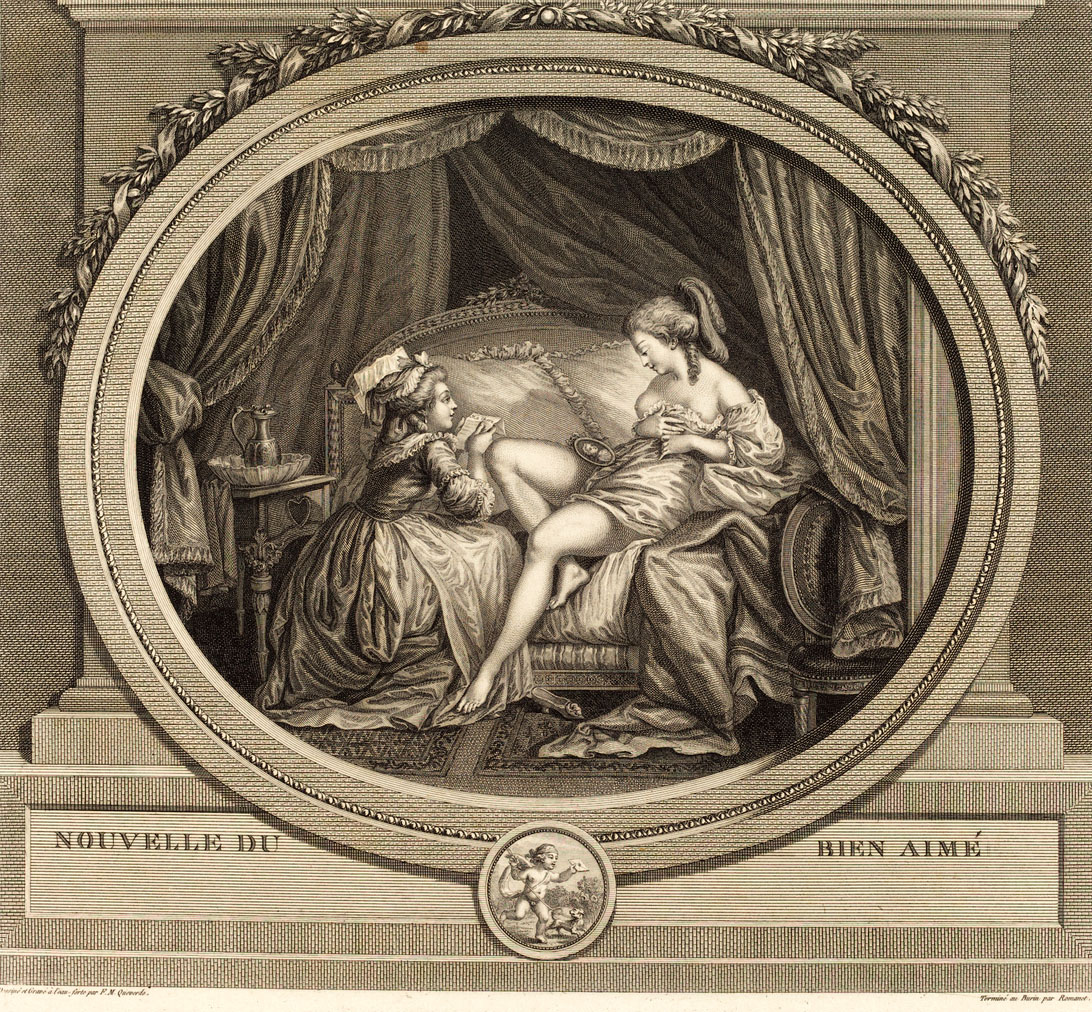
News from the Beloved; after a design by Queverdo

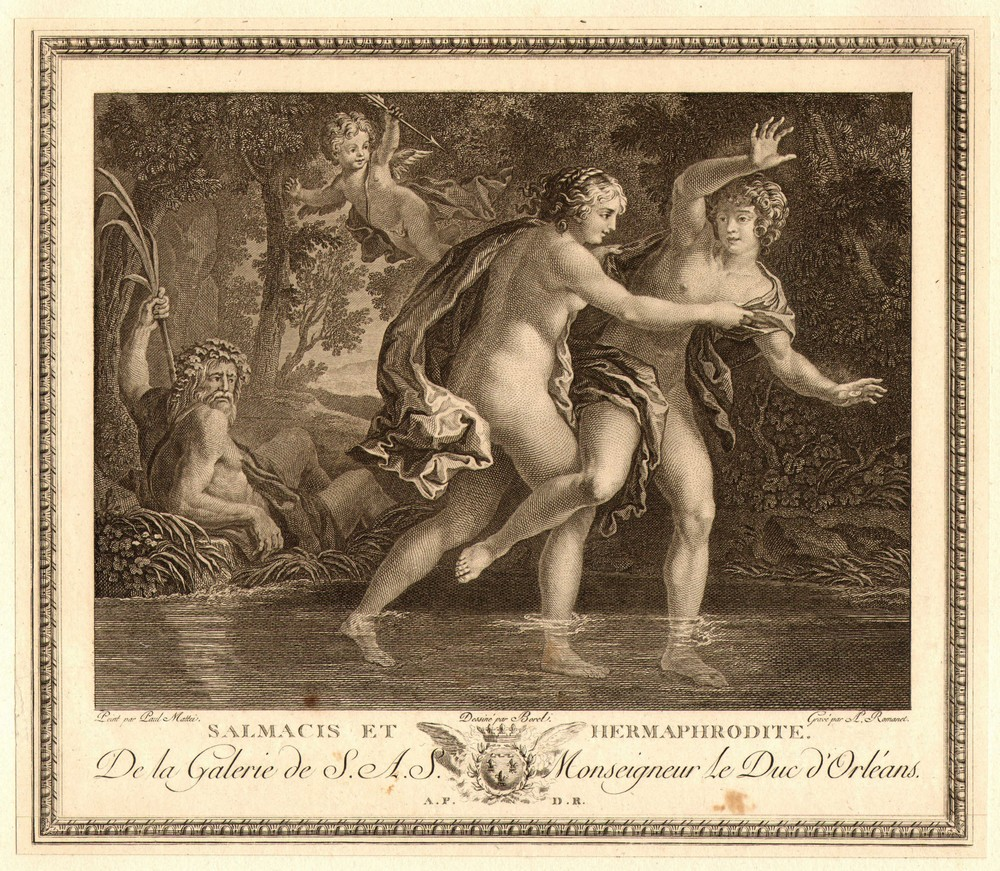
Salmacis and Hermaphrodite; after a painting by Matteis

Antoine-Louis Romanet (7 January 1742, Paris - 1 April 1807, Saint-Maurice) was a French engraver, designer, and miniaturist.

== Biography ==
He was descended from a line of engravers, long established in Paris. One of his cousins was married to the famous engraver, Jean-Georges Wille, who gave him his first lessons. In 1765, through Wille, he obtained an apprenticeship in Basel with Christian von Mechel, where he learned advanced techniques for using the burin.

In 1767, he left Basel then, in 1770, married Françoise-Nicole née Mancel, the daughter of an innkeeper on the Rue Saint-Jacques, with Wille as witness. They had at least four children; two daughters and two sons.

The police came to his home in 1776, arrested him, and took him to his studio, where they confiscated the copper plates and proofs of an engraving depicting a certain "Mme. de Saint-Vincent". She had filed a complaint in the context of an "affair of morals". The police report also cited his dealer, named "Isabey".

In 1781, he went into business with the art dealer, Jean-Baptiste-Pierre Lebrun, who was himself a painter. At one point, he was forced to sue for payment. He was a regular exhibnitor at the " Salon de la Correspondance" (1779-1787), organized by the writer, Pahin de la Blancherie.

The Swiss miniaturist, Marc-Louis Arlaud, became his student in 1797. Romanet also worked in that genre, but remained almost entirely known for his engravings. During the latter part of his career, his workshop was located at the Place du Pont-Saint-Michel, which disappeared during the creation of the Boulevard Saint-Michel in the 1860s.
