= Charles Rollier =

Swiss painter

Charles Rollier (1912–1968) was a Swiss painter.

== Biography ==
Charles Rollier was born in 1912 in Milan. He was the third son of Eric Rollier an industrialist and member of the Waldensians. From 1930, he attended the Academia of Fine Arts of Brera (Milan). In spring 1934, he left Italy because of the growing fascism and settled down in Basel (Switzerland). He met Georg Schmidt, the curator of the Kusthaus of Basel and got in touch with other artists, of whom Coghuf (Ernst Stocker).

Between 1938 and 1940, he lived in Paris and became friend with Gustav Bolin. Both of them stayed in Mirmande in Drôme (France) while the Germans occupied Paris. At this period he met Alexandre Garbell (known as Sacha) with whom he will keep in touch.

His father was worrying about the war's dangers so Rollier went back to Switzerland, in 1941, and settled down in Geneva. In the Old Town's cafés frequented by artists and intellectuals living in Geneva, he related with Alberto Giacometti and Roger Montandon. It was in La Clemence, one of these cafés, that he introduced Annette Arm to Giacometti. They were married two years later, in 1943. Rollier married Alice Vincent. They only stayed together two years, from 1942 to 1945.

The Moos gallery organized his first exhibition together with d'Arnold d'Alrti. Rollier received the recognition of some known artist like Tristan Tzara or Constant Rey-Millet, and met the art-review Pierre Courthion who became a friend and a great admirer.

In May 1964, he went back to Paris, spent time in Montparnasse, Saint-Germain-des-Prés and in the cafés (Les Deux Magots, Le Flore, Le Dôme). He met there Montandon, Giacometti, Tzara, Bolin et Garbell and some artist of the so-called School of Paris (École de Paris), especially Jean Bazaine, Charles Lapicque and Nicolas de Staël, to whom he will become very close. Rollier married Gisèle Bachmann on October the 5, 1946. During his time in Paris he associated with Gustav Bolin, Alberto Giacometti, Nicolas de Staël, Roger Montandon et Tristan Tzara.

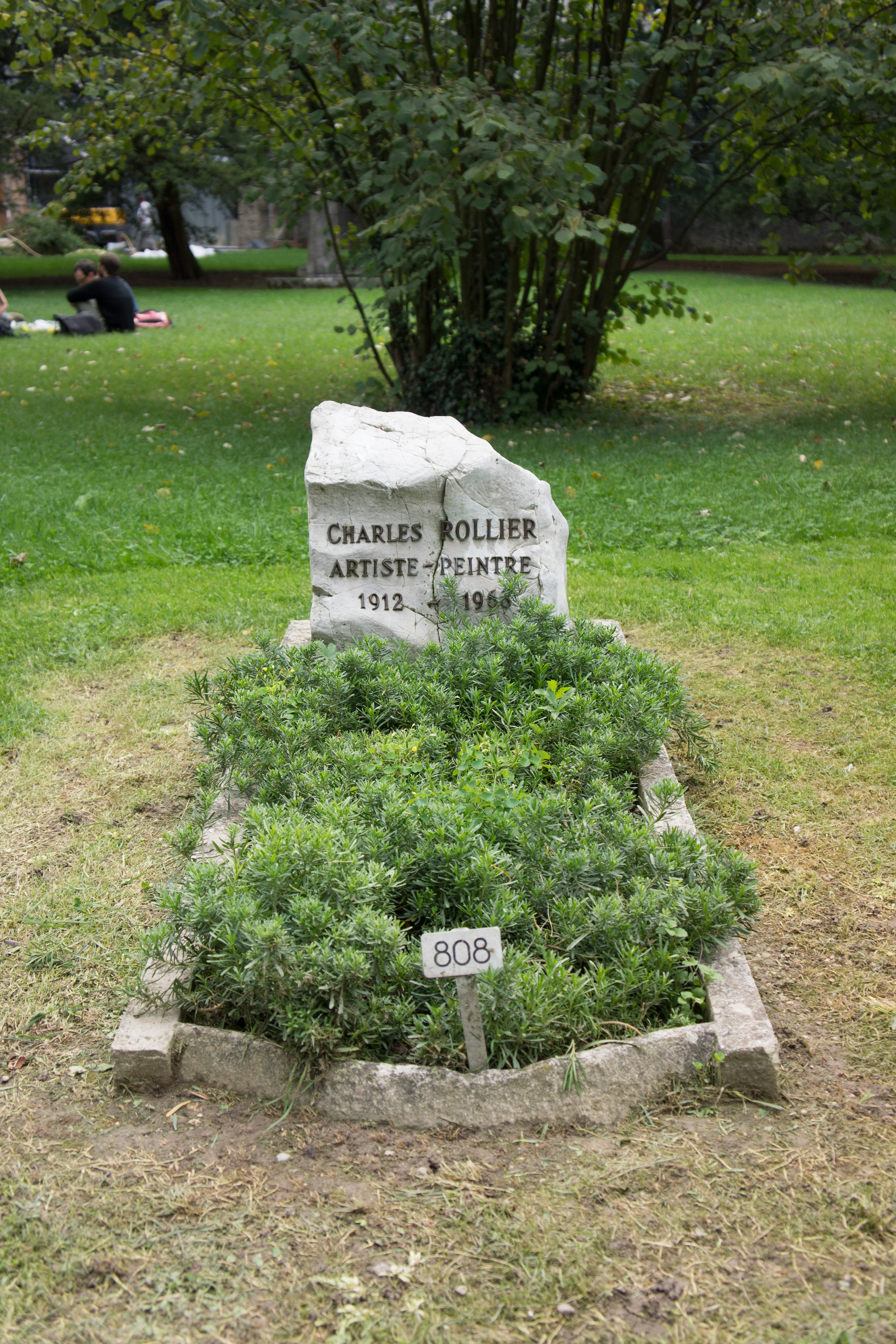
Rollier's grave

From 1948, he took part for three years in the Salon de Mai in Paris. He lived between Geneva, Paris and Torre Pellice (Piedmont) where he spent his summers. In Paris he met with Courthion and de Staël, and first met Hans Hartung, Raoul Dufy, the sculptor Nino Franchina, the painter Marie Raymond. He exhibited notably at the galerie du Siècle and at the Helmhaus (Zürich) for the Kunstlergemeinschaft «Réveil». Rollier studied Karl Jasper's philosophy, the Husserl's phenomenology and the Byzantine culture.

In 1952, Rollier moved definitely in Geneva with his wife and both his children. He located his atelier in Chêne-Bourg not far from where he lived. That is where he produced the major part of his work. He took part to a great number of exhibitions (in Switzerland, France, Italy, Germany, England, Denmark and Japan) and showed a growing interest in various religious and philosophical traditions, like Zen, Buddhism, Sufism, Shaktism, Hölderlin's romantic mystism, the Christian mystics, Neoplatonism, and in the artistic traditions from India and China (Lobue 1985; 1985).

From 1955, Rollier found his own original and unclassified pictorial language. He did the poster for XXth century Swiss Art in the frame of the 1964's national exhibition. Three of his paintings are shown at this exhibition. He is considered like one of the most significant artist of the century's Swiss arts development.

His production was suddenly interrupted on May 15, 1968, when he died of a heart attack while he was the chief juryman at the Geneva court. He is buried at the Cimetière des Rois (Cemetery of Kings) which is considered the Genevan Panthéon.

=== The artist's approach ===
Rollier looked for trans-figuring the forms and represent the sacred dimension of the women. This research is based on a transcendental eroticism that Rollier wanted to be liberating.

Rollier's artistic work goes together with a philosophical and spiritual research. He finds answers by the Christian mystics like Gregoire Palamas or Denys l’Aréopagite, and in some traditions coming from classical India, like Shaktism and tantric Buddhism. By discovering these various traditions, he finds the justification to art that he could not find in Protestantism in which he had been raised and that had always been one of his preoccupations: art is a link with the sacred, that offer to the sensorial world the subtle dimension that allows to go beyond the condition of immanence. From the 1955’, his work has one main ambition: to represent the matrix that creates, unifies, and originates everything.

- "I say precisely “mystic physiology”! Because to paint “Feminine Archangels” is something completely different than to paint the women's body. And it is completely different than to paint abstract! That is the mysterious and secret point!!!" (Writing, December 11, 1961.)

== Bibliography ==
- Claire Stoullig, "Charles Rollier et les autres. La perception de son oeuvre aujourd'hui", in: Geneva, 47, 1999, p. 133-148.
- Charles Rollier, 1912-1968, Charles Rollier ou la transfiguration, 13 February - 17 May, cat. exp., Musée Rath, Geneva, 1998.
- Charles Rollier, 1912-1968, Charles Rollier : Les deux phases cardinales, Peintures 1955-1968, cat. exp., Cantonal Museum of Fine Arts, Lausanne, 1 September-7 October 1984, Aarau, Aargauer Kunsthaus, Frühjahr 1985.
- Rainer Michael Mason, "Rollier (Charles)", in: Petit Larousse de la peinture, vol. II, p. 1583, Paris: Librairie Larousse, 1979.
- Rainer Michael Mason, "Rollier (Charles)", in: E. Bénézit, Dictionnaire, vol. IX, Paris: Gründ, 1976.
- Pierre Courthion, Ch. Rollier, (with an interview of Jean Leymarie and a texte by Jeanlouis Cornuz), Neuchâtel: Ed. Ides et Calendes, 1969.
