= Utopiales =

Annual international science fiction festival in Nantes, France

Utopiales is an annual international science fiction festival held in Nantes, France, probably the largest European event in the field. It covers science fiction and fantasy literature, film, fine arts, comics, role-playing games, and animation, from a distinctly European point of view. Founded by Bruno della Chiesa, and run by science fiction museum director Patrick Gyger from 2001 to 2005, it is put on by the "Association du Festival International de Science-Fiction de Nantes".

The festival, run by professional staff, is funded in part by the City of Nantes and has extensive corporate sponsorship, unlike conventions put on by traditional science fiction fandom. One feature of Utopiales is the "Prix Utopia" Grandmaster award, given for overall contribution to science fiction literature. Past winners have included Robert Silverberg, Jack Vance, Brian W. Aldiss, Frederik Pohl, Christopher Priest, and Michael Moorcock.

== Editions ==
Year	Subject	Illustrator of the edition	President	Artistic chief	Entries
2000		Enki Bilal	Mireille Rivalland	Bruno della Chiesa	
2001	End of the Odyssee ?	Patrick Woodroffe	Pierre Bordage	Patrick Gyger	20 000
2002		Jean-Claude Mézières	Pierre Bordage	Patrick Gyger	28 000
2003	The new extraordinary landscapes	Deak Ferrand	Pierre Bordage	Patrick Gyger	30 000
2004	The utopia	Stephan Martinière	Pierre Bordage	Patrick Gyger	37 000
2005	Jules Verne	Jean Giraud	Pierre Bordage	Patrick Gyger	37 000
2006	The invasion comes from Marx !	Richard Raaphorst	Pierre Bordage	Anaîs Emery	38 000
2007	Climates	Luc Schuiten	Pierre Bordage	Association of the Event	40 000
2008	Networks	Fred Blanchard & Yoann	Pierre Bordage	Association of the Event	40 000
2009	Better Worlds	James Gurney	Pierre Bordage	Association of the Event	40 000
2010	Frontiers	Philippe Druillet	Pierre Bordage	Association of the Event	42 000
2011	Story(ies)	Greg Broadmore	Pierre Bordage	Association of the Event	46 000
2012	Origins	Nicolas Fructus	Roland Lehoucq	Ugo Bellagamba	50 000
2013	Other World(s)	Vincent Callebau	Roland Lehoucq	Ugo Bellagamba	60 000
2014	Intelligence(s)	Chris Foss	Roland Lehoucq	Ugo Bellagamba	60 000
2015	Reality(ies)	Manchu	Roland Lehoucq	Ugo Bellagamba	65 000
2016	Machine(s)	Denis Bajram	Roland Lehoucq	Jeanne A-Debats	82 000
2017	Time	Laurent Durieux	Roland Lehoucq	Jeanne A-Debats	90 000
2018	Body(ies)	Beb-Deum	Roland Lehoucq	Jeanne A-Debats	90 000+
2019	Encode / Decode	Mathieu Bablet	Roland Lehoucq	Jeanne A-Debats	100 000
2020	Traces	Alex Alice	Roland Lehoucq	Jeanne A-Debats	canceled
2021	Transformations	Alex Alice	Roland Lehoucq	Jeanne A-Debats	75 000
2022	Limite(s)	Marc-Antoine Mathieu	Roland Lehoucq	Jeanne A-Debats	108.000
