= Museum of Contemporary Design and Applied Arts =

Museum in Switzerland

- Musée de design et d'arts appliqués contemporains
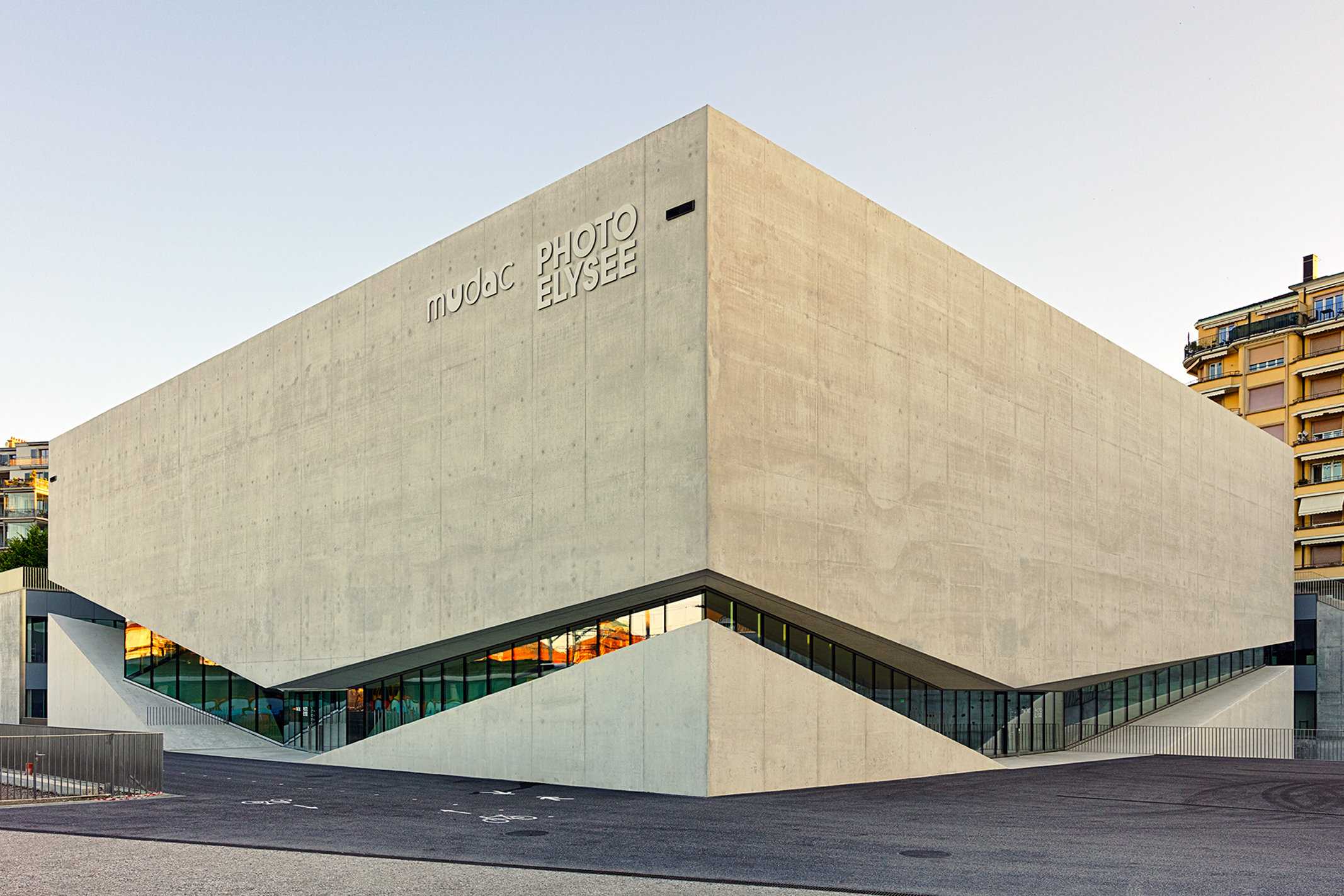
- Location: Lausanne, Switzerland
- Coordinates: 46.5221°N 6.6353°E
- Website: www.mudac.ch

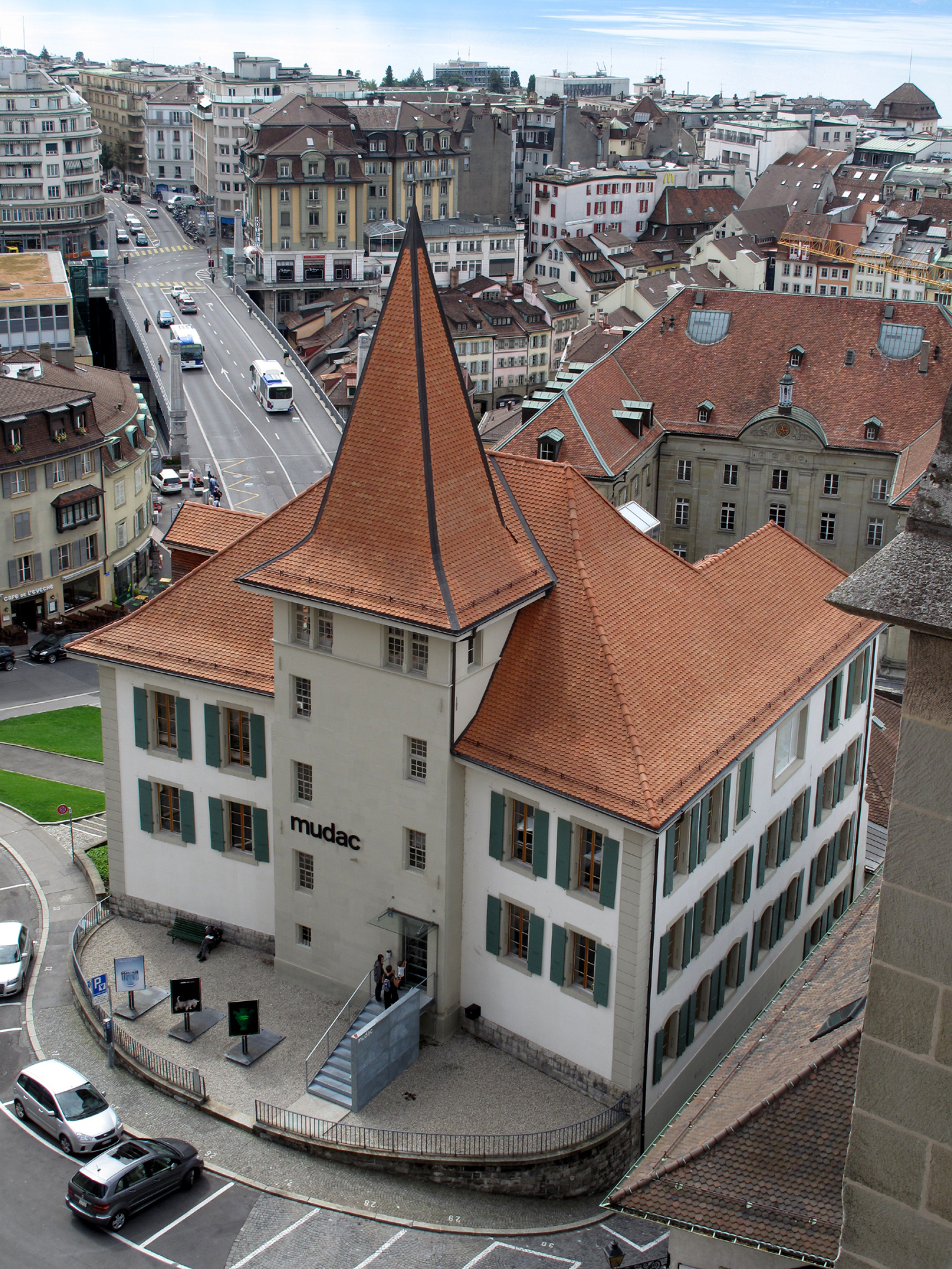
Mudac

The Museum of Contemporary Design and Applied Arts (French: Musée de design et d'arts appliqués contemporains, MUDAC) is a museum in Lausanne, Switzerland. It is part of the Plateforme 10 Arts District.

== See also ==
- Applied arts
- List of art museums
- List of cultural property of national significance in Switzerland: Vaud
- List of design museums
- List of museums in Switzerland
