= Le Lieu Unique =

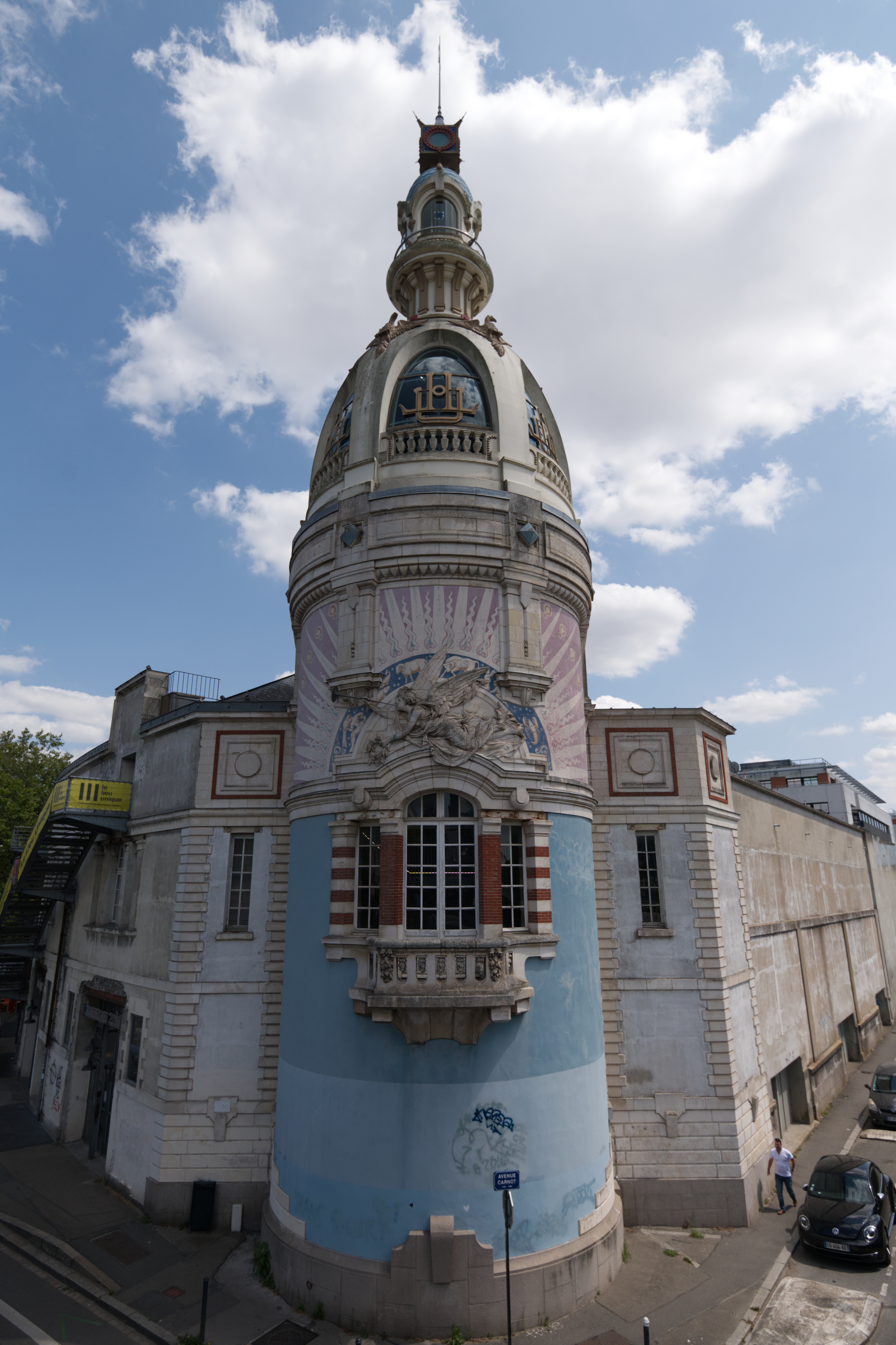
- The tower of Le Lieu Unique
- Interactive map of the Le Lieu Unique area

General information
- Location: Nantes, France, 2 Quai Ferdinand Favre, Nantes, France
- Coordinates: 47.215276°N 1.545749°W
- Year built: 1846
- Opened: 1 January 2000

Design and construction
- Architects: Auguste Bluyssen, Patrick Bouchain, Jean-Marie Lepinay, Nicole Concordet

Le Lieu Unique (French pronunciation: [lə ljø ynik], lit. 'The Unique Place') is a center for contemporary culture located in Nantes, France. Opened on 1 January 2000, it is housed in a former biscuit factory at the center of the city.

It was founded by Jean Blaise, directed by Patrick Gyger from 2011 to 2020, and is currently directed by Eli Commins.

Recognised as a scène nationale of Nantes (center for contemporary culture), Le Lieu Unique is known for artistic exploration, cultural celebration, and conviviality that is recognized for its spirit of curiosity in the different domains of art: visual art, theatre, dance, circus, music, but also literature, philosophy, architecture, and digital culture.

The Le Lieu Unique is a venue for various art exhibitions and shows including theater, dance, circus and music as well as concerts, literary gatherings, philosophical debates, exhibitions, residencies for artists and festivals.

== History ==
Built in 1895 as the headquarters of the LU biscuit manufacturers, the building closed in 1986 and fell into disrepair, but became home to various theatre companies, such as Royal de Luxe. In 1998, restoration work on the only remaining tower began, conducted by Jean-Marie Lépinay, as well as regeneration of the factory by the French architect Patrick Bouchain, in one of his first major projects.

=== Opening in 2000 ===
Le Lieu Unique opened on 30 December 1999, during the "End of century" festival in Nantes. This opening was marked by the Grenier du siècle (Store of the century). A translucent double wall was designed to receive a collection of objects donated by the public which were then store in cans to be opened one hundred years later.

== Gallery ==
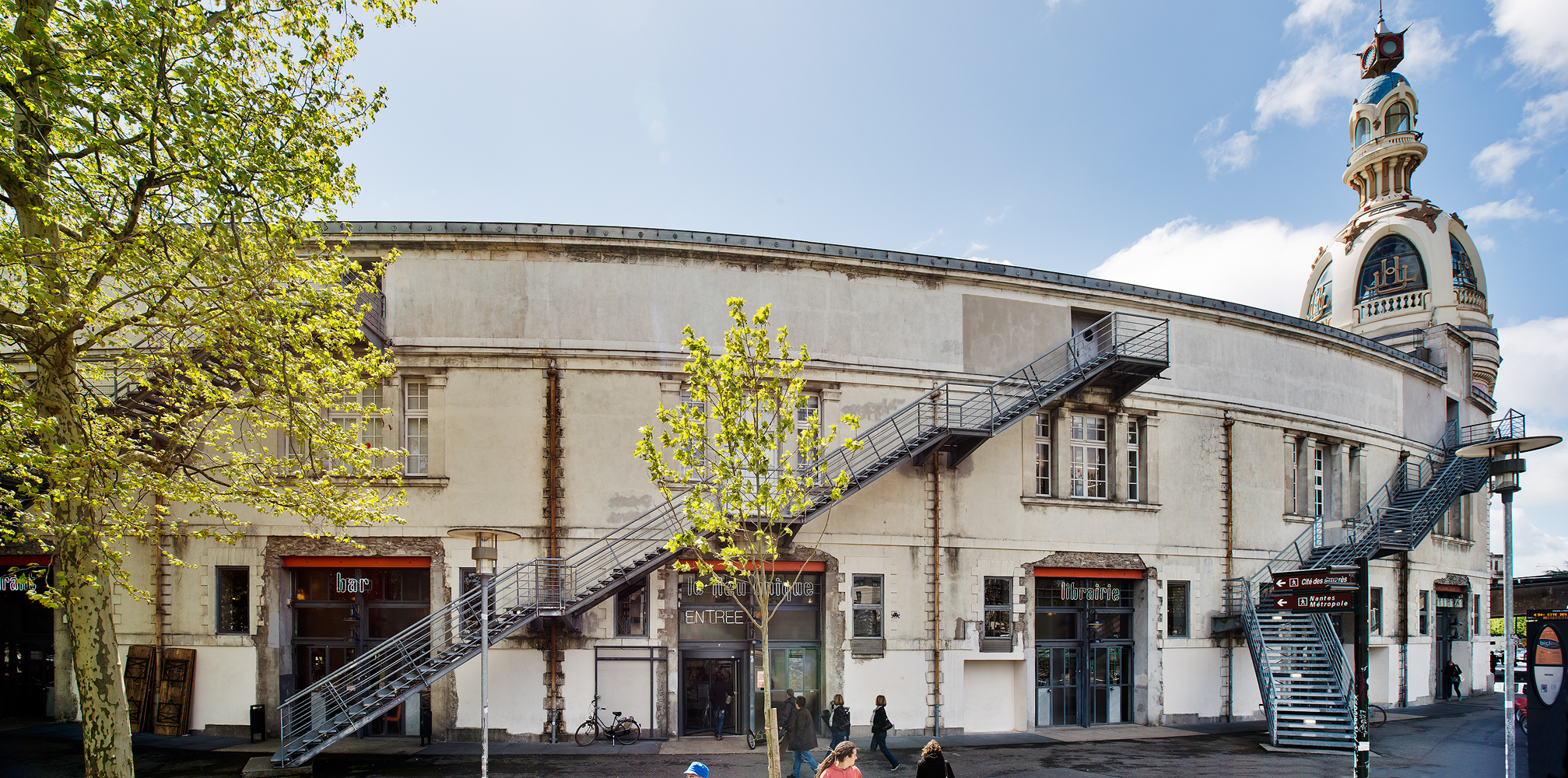
Public entrance

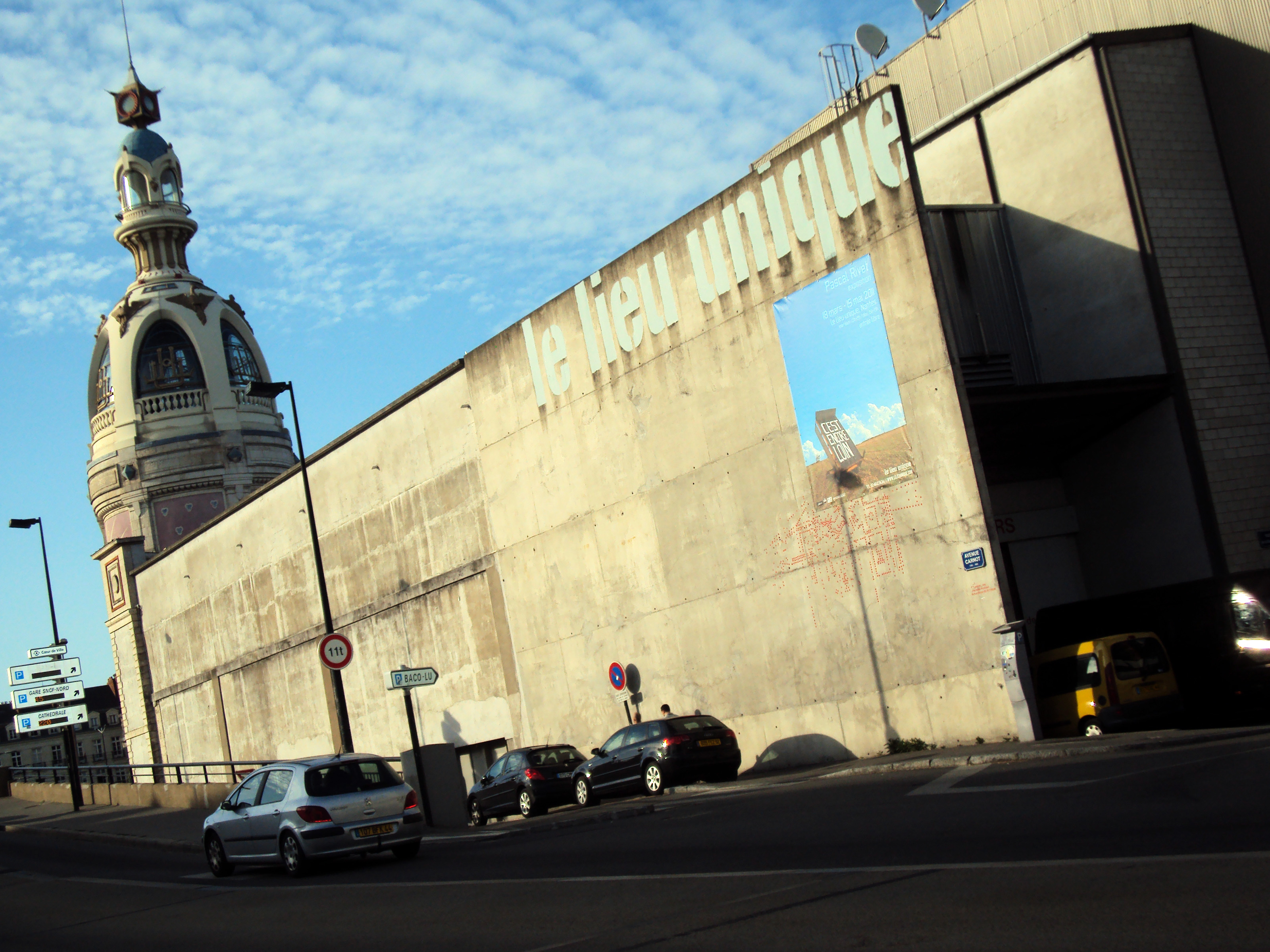
At the back

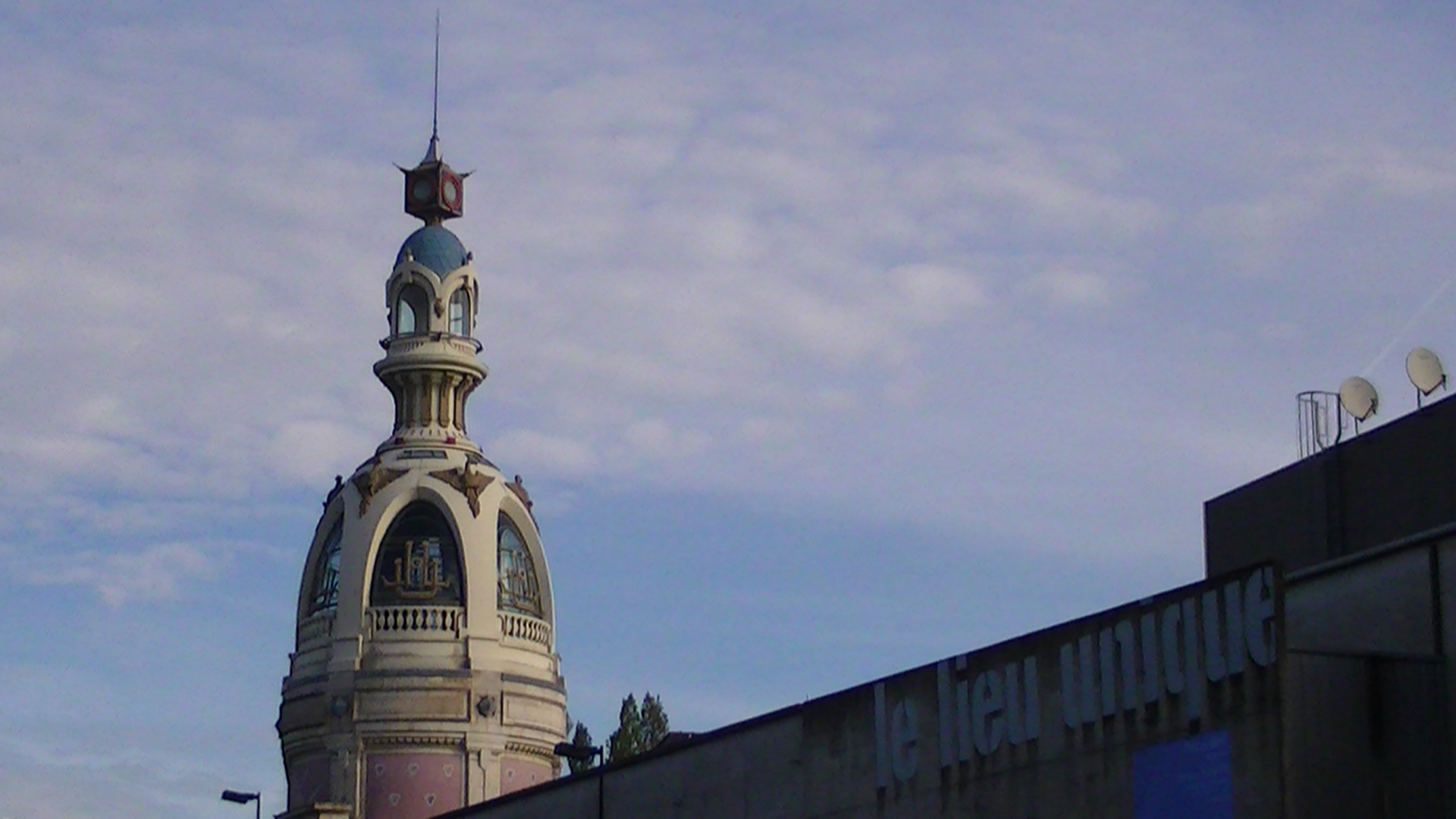
The Tower

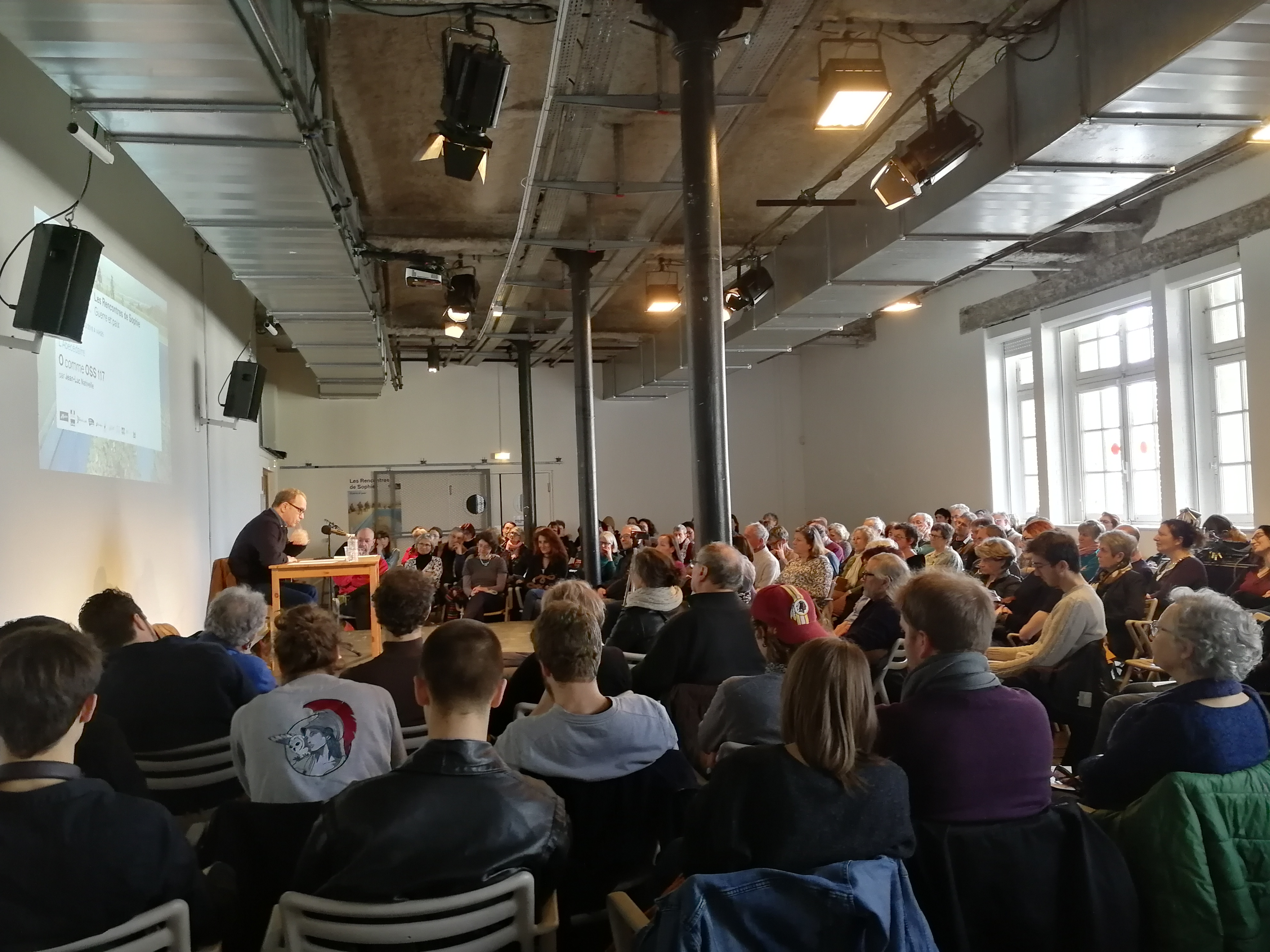
Atelier 1
