= Marc-Louis Arlaud =

Swiss painter

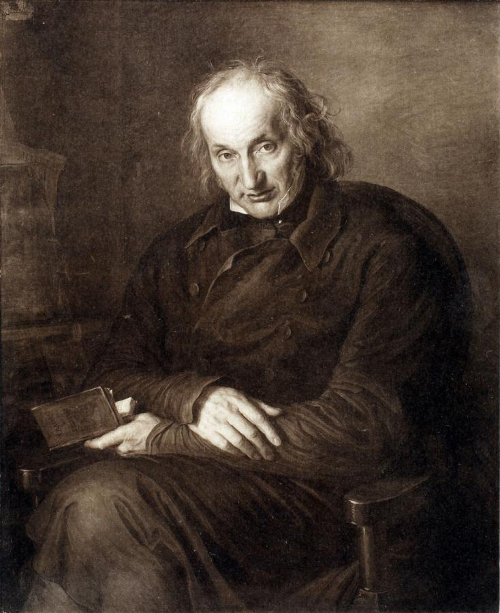
- Marc-Louis Arlaud
- Born: September 26, 1772; Orbe, Switzerland
- Died: May 1, 1845 (aged 72); Lausanne, Switzerland
- Citizenship: Republic of Geneva, Swiss since 1802
- Education: Jacques-Louis David, Paris

Marc-Louis Arlaud (26 September 1772 – 1 May 1845) was a Swiss portrait painter. He was the first Director of the Vaudoise Cantonal School of Design and the first Conservator of what is now known as the Cantonal Museum of Fine Arts in Lausanne.

== Biography ==
He originally attended school in his native Orbe, and later in Yverdon. His initial artistic training came from his cousins, the miniaturists Louis-Ami Arlaud-Jurine and Jérémie Arlaud (1758–1827) in Geneva. In 1797, he went to Paris where he worked in the studios of another miniaturist, Antoine-Louis Romanet, until he could begin studies with Jacques-Louis David in 1799.

He was originally a citizen (bourgeois) of the Republic of Geneva. He also became citizen of Orbe in 1802, which was then already in Switzerland.

In 1811, he was expelled from France for a "délit d'opinion" (offensive opinion) concerning the conduct of Napoleon and his government. He returned to Lausanne and opened a workshop where he taught drawing. In 1821, the Grand Council of Vaud adopted a decree that would establish an official drawing school. The following year, the Academy of Lausanne held a competition to select the first Director and chose Arlaud. He retained that position until his death.

Hoping to establish a fine arts museum, he donated 34,000 Francs to the city for that purpose. In exchange, he requested a lifelong pension and his offer was accepted in 1834. The museum was designed by Louis Wenger and inaugurated in 1841. Arlaud was named to be the Curator/Conservator and held that position until 1844. During his tenure, he built the museum's collection, which included a large donation of paintings from the family of Abraham-Louis-Rodolphe Ducros and many works by contemporary artists.

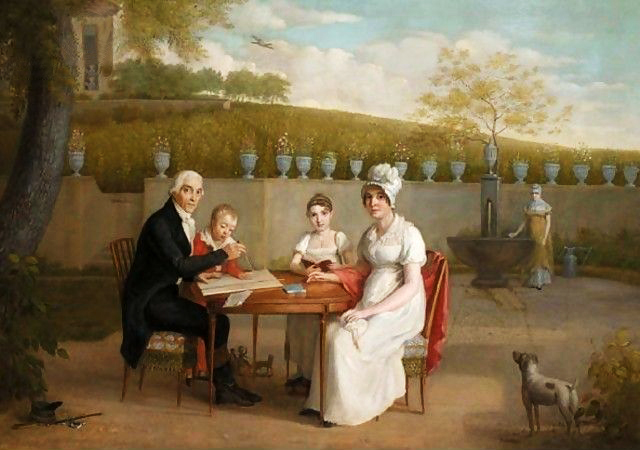
Portrait of the Arlaud Family

Near the end of 1844, he became bedridden due to illness and died in May the following year. He left 2,500 Francs to the government of Vaud to commission a painting from Charles Gleyre, a local painter who was then living in Paris. The painting, which depicted the local hero, Abraham Davel, on the scaffold was completed in 1850. It was destroyed by fire during an act of vandalism in 1980.

In 1904, the works from the Musée Arlaud were transferred to the Palais de Rumine. The portion housing the collection is now known as the Cantonal Museum of Fine Arts.
