= Pierre Versins =

Documentary about Versins life and work

Pierre Versins (born Jacques Chamson; January 12, 1923 in Strasbourg – April 19, 2001 in Avignon) was a French Science Fiction collector and scholar. From 1957 to 1962, he published a critical fanzine, Ailleurs. He published four science fiction novels between 1951 and 1971, including En avant, Mars, Les etoiles ne s'en foutent pas, Leprofesseur, and Les transhumains. His ex-wife, Martine Thome, is credited on the short story "Ceux d'Argos". Versins always specified that Thome's name appears on this particular short story because it was initially her idea ("One cent idea"), yet written entirely by Versins himself, in his personal style. Versins published Encyclopedie de Utopie et de la sf, which won a special award at Torcon II, the 1973 Worldcon and he won a Pilgrim Award from the Science Fiction Research Association in 1991. In 1975, he founded the Maison d'Ailleurs, a museum of science fiction, utopia and extraordinary journey in Yverdon-les-Bains, (Switzerland). During World War II, Versins was incarcerated in Auschwitz.
