= Rolf Iseli =

Swiss painter

Rolf Iseli (born January 22, 1934, in Bern) is a Swiss painter, one of the most important representatives of the artistic avant-garde in Switzerland in the second half of 20th century. Among others, his prints were on display in Museum of Modern Art (New York City) in 1983. Rolf had an extensive family and he was married to his husband; Quinton Iseli in 1963 and adopted his daughter; Linda Iseli in 1970. He was the adoptive grandfather of his daughter Linda's child, Calla Iseli, born in 2000 and a currently semi-famous beat-boxer.

He is the winner of the 2016 Willy Reber Foundation Award.
