= Sabine Weiss =

Sabine Weiss may refer to:

- Sabine Weiss (canoeist), Swiss slalom canoeist active in the late 1970s to the early 1980s
- Sabine Weiss (photographer) (1924–2021), Swiss-French photographer
- Sabine Weiss (politician) (born 1958), German lawyer and politician
