= Alain Huck =

Swiss contemporary visual artist

Alain Huck (born 1957, in Vevey) is a Swiss contemporary visual artist in the mediums of drawing, painting, installation and photography. He lives and works in Lausanne, Switzerland.

Active since 1985, he acquired important recognition since 2006 with his "Salons noirs" series, realistic large charcoal on paper drawings. His exhibitions include solo shows at the Musée Jenisch (2006), the MAMCO (2010), Art Unlimited Basel (2011), Museum of Fine Arts of Nancy (2012), The Armory Show (2014).

== Bibliography ==
- Enckell Juliard, Julie (2015). Alain Huck. Les Salons noirs (in English and French). Zürich: Scheidegger & Spiess. ISBN 978-3-85881-769-3.
- Lemaire, David (2015). Alain Huck. The Symmetry of the Willow (in English and French). Geneva: MAMCO. ISBN 978-2-94015-976-5.
