= 2026 in Switzerland =

- Decades: 2000s; 2010s; 2020s
- See also: History of Switzerland; Timeline of Swiss history; List of years in Switzerland

Events in the year 2026 in Switzerland.

== Incumbents ==
- President of the Swiss Confederation: Guy Parmelin
- President of the National Council: Pierre-André Page
- President of the Swiss Council of States: Stefan Engler

== Events ==
=== January ===
- 1 January – At least 41 people are killed in a fire at a bar in Crans-Montana, Valais.
- 5 January – The federal government imposes a four-year freeze on any assets held by Venezuelan president Nicolás Maduro and his close associates in Switzerland.
- 28 January – Sanija Ameti, a member of the Zurich municipal council, is fined CHF3,500 for publishing images of herself firing a pistol at an auction poster of a 14th-century painting of the Madonna and Child by Tommaso del Mazza in 2024.

=== February ===
- 16 February – A train is derailed by an avalanche near Goppenstein, injuring five people.

=== March ===
- 8 March – 2026 Swiss referendums: Voters reject a referendum proposing to reduce the Swiss Broadcasting Corporation's annual licence fee from 335 francs to 200 francs, with interim results showing about 62% voting against the measure.
- 10 March – At least six people are killed in an arson attack on a postal bus in Kerzers.
- 18 March – One person is killed when a cable car cabin crashes down a snowy mountainside in Engelberg, Obwalden.
- 20 March – Switzerland halts weapons exports to the United States, citing its principle of neutrality and US involvement in the 2026 Iran war.
- 24 March – In a test performed by CERN in Geneva, antimatter particles are transported by road for the first time, to assess their stability during transit. An estimated 100 to 1,000 antiprotons are carried in a Penning trap across a distance of 5 km (3.1 mi).

=== May ===
- 28 May – Three people are injured in a stabbing attack at Winterthur railway station.

=== June ===
- 11 June–19 July – Switzerland participates at the 2026 FIFA World Cup.
- 14 June – 2026 Swiss referendums: Voters reject a referendum proposing to place the maximum Swiss population at 10 million.

=== July ===
- 1 July – 2026 Écône consecrations: Members of the Society of Saint Pius X (SSPX) in Écône consecrate four bishops against the direct orders of Pope Leo XIV, triggering a religious schism between SSPX and the Catholic Church.
- 24 July – The United States imposes a 12.5% tariff on Switzerland, citing the presence of alleged forced labour in the supply chain.

=== August ===
- 30 August – A woman is killed and five people are wounded, one critically in a rave shooting in Aarau.

=== September ===
- 9 September – A hydroelectric plant explosion kills two people in Piotta.
- 10 September
  - A 200-page dossier on Nazi war criminal Josef Mengele, nicknamed the "Angel of Death," is published by the Federal Intelligence Service.
  - Five people die when a tourist coach crashes in Grisons.
- 15 September – A Cirrus SR22 light aircraft crashes into a mountain slope near Leukerbad, killing three people.
- 27 September – 2026 Swiss referendums: Voters reject a referendum proposing to enforce a tighter interpretation of Swiss neutrality, with more than 70% of the electorate voting against.

=== October ===
- 7 October – Authorities pledge about $2 million for humanitarian aid in Yemen.

=== Predicted and scheduled ===
- 8 March–29 November – 2026 Swiss referendums

== Holidays ==
- 1 January – New Year's Day
- 2 January – Berchtoldstag Day
- 6 January – Epiphany
- 1 March – Republic Day
- 19 March – Saint Joseph's Day
- 3 April – Good Friday
- 6 April – Easter Monday
- 9 April – Näfels Ride
- 1 May – International Workers' Day
- 14 May – Ascension Day
- 25 May – Whit Monday
- 4 June – Corpus Christi
- 29 June – Saints Peter and Paul
- 1 August – Swiss National Day
- 15 August – Assumption Day
- 10 September – Jeûne genevois
- 20 September – Lundi du Jeûne
- 25 September – Saint Nicholas of Flüe Day
- 1 November – All Saints' Day
- 8 December – Immaculate Conception
- 25 December – Christmas Day
- 26 December – Saint Stephen's Day
- 31 December – Restoration Day

== Deaths ==
- 3 January – Claude-Inga Barbey, 64, comedian, writer, and actress (The Death of Mario Ricci)
- 10 January – Erich von Däniken, 90, author and ufologist (Chariots of the Gods?)
- 11 January – Ueli Kestenholz, 50, snowboarder, Olympic bronze medallist (1998)
- 22 February – Willy Loretan, 91, politician.
- 13 March – Jacques Basler, 84, sculptor.
- 6 June – Ingeborg Kaiser, 95, German-Swiss writer
- 10 June – Jean Ziegler, 92, sociologist, MP (1981–1999).
