= 2025 in Switzerland =

- Decades: 2000s; 2010s; 2020s
- See also: History of Switzerland; Timeline of Swiss history; List of years in Switzerland

Events in the year 2025 in Switzerland.

== Incumbents ==
- President of the Swiss Confederation: Karin Keller-Sutter
- President of the National Council: Maja Riniker
- President of the Swiss Council of States: Andrea Caroni

== Events ==
=== January ===
- 1 January – Karin Keller-Sutter is sworn in as President of Switzerland.

=== March ===
- 17 March – An Extra EA-400 light aircraft crashes shortly after takeoff in La Punt Chamues-ch, killing all three people on board.
- 21 March – The Swiss Federal Council rejects a Swiss People's Party (SVP) proposal aiming to cap Switzerland's population at 10 million.

=== May ===
- 13–17 May – Switzerland finishes at 10th place at the Eurovision Song Contest 2025 in Basel.
- 17 May –
  - Two people are killed in an avalanche at Eiger.
  - 2025 Blatten glacier collapse: The village of Blatten (Lötschen) is ordered evacuated due to a mudslide caused by the disintegration of the Birch glacier. Another glacial collapse largely destroys the town on 28 May, leaving one person missing.
- 24 May – One person is killed in an avalanche while climbing the Morgenhorn.
- 25 May – Five skiers are found dead at the Adler Glacier in the Rimpfischhorn.

=== June ===
- 16 June – The village of Brienz/Brinzauls is ordered evacuated due to a risk of landslide.

=== July ===
- 2–27 July – UEFA Women's Euro 2025

=== August ===
- 1 August – The European Court of Justice rules that decisions made by Swiss-based international organizations, including FIFA, the Court of Arbitration for Sport, and the International Olympic Committee, can be challenged outside the country.
- 24 August – A South Korean climber dies after a fall while descending from the Matterhorn.
- 28 August – The Federal Supreme Court of Switzerland upholds the 2024 conviction of Islamic scholar Tariq Ramadan for rape and sexual coercion.

=== September ===
- 16 September – Switzerland signs a free trade agreement with the Mercosur bloc.
- 28 September – 2025 Swiss referendums: A referendum in Zurich to ban the use of petrol-fuelled leaf blowers and leaf vacuums due to concerns over noise and air pollution passes with 61% approval, while in Thurgau, a motion to lift a ban on secular events on five religious holidays is passed by a majority of 51.1%.

=== October ===
- 15 October – Hikers in the Ober Gabelhorn discover the remains of another hiker who disappeared in 1994.

=== November ===
- 10 November – The National Hockey League opens an office in Zurich as part of efforts to increase its international presence.
- 18 November – Switzerland qualifies for the 2026 FIFA World Cup after drawing with Kosovo 1-1 at the 2026 FIFA World Cup qualification.
- 20 November – Multiple Roman-era coins are stolen in a heist at the Musee Romain in Lausanne.
- 30 November – 2025 Swiss referendums: Voters reject motions to replace compulsory military service for males with compulsory military service for all genders, and to impose new taxes on the super-rich to finance efforts against climate change by margins of 84% and 78% respectively.

=== December ===
- 11 December – Alpine yodeling is recognized as intangible cultural heritage by UNESCO.

== Art and entertainment ==
- List of Swiss submissions for the Academy Award for Best International Feature Film

== Holidays ==
- 1 January – New Year's Day
- 2 January – Berchtoldstag Day
- 6 January – Epiphany
- 1 March – Republic Day
- 19 March – Saint Joseph's Day
- 3 April – Näfels Ride
- 18 April – Good Friday
- 21 April – Easter Monday
- 1 May – International Workers' Day
- 29 May – Ascension Day
- 9 June – Whit Monday
- 19 June – Corpus Christi
- 29 June – Saints Peter and Paul
- 1 August – Swiss National Day
- 15 August – Assumption Day
- 11 September – Jeûne genevois
- 21 September – Lundi du Jeûne
- 25 September – Saint Nicholas of Flüe Day
- 1 November – All Saints' Day
- 8 December – Immaculate Conception
- 25 December – Christmas Day
- 26 December – Saint Stephen's Day
- 31 December – Restoration Day

== Deaths ==
=== January ===
- 2 January
  - Bernie Constantin, 77, songwriter and radio show host.
  - Werner Leimgruber, 90, footballer (Zürich, national team).

=== May ===
- 10 May – Koyo Kouoh, 57, Cameroonian-born museum curator.

=== September ===
- 18 September – Alfred Heer, 57, MNC (since 2007).

=== November ===
- 29 November –
  - Ludwig Minelli, 92, lawyer, founder of Dignitas.
  - Erwin Jutzet, 74, politician, member of the Council of State of the Canton of Fribourg (2007–2016), National Council (1995–2007), and the Grand Council of Fribourg (1982–1995).

=== December ===
- 12 December – Werner Ferrari, 78, convicted serial killer.
- 31 December – Peter-Lukas Graf, 96, flutist, conductor and academic.
