= 2027 in Switzerland =

- Decades: 2000s; 2010s; 2020s
- See also: History of Switzerland; Timeline of Swiss history; List of years in Switzerland

Events in the year 2027 in Switzerland.

== Events ==
=== Predicted and scheduled ===
- February – FIS Alpine World Ski Championships 2027 in Crans-Montana
- 24 October – 2027 Swiss federal election

== Holidays ==
- 1 January – New Year's Day
- 2 January – Berchtoldstag Day
- 6 January – Epiphany
- 1 March – Republic Day
- 19 March – Saint Joseph's Day
- 26 March – Good Friday
- 29 March – Easter Monday
- 1 April – Näfels Ride
- 1 May – International Workers' Day
- 6 May – Ascension Day
- 17 May – Whit Monday
- 27 May – Corpus Christi
- 29 June – Saints Peter and Paul
- 1 August – Swiss National Day
- 15 August – Assumption Day
- 9 September – Jeûne genevois
- 20 September – Lundi du Jeûne
- 25 September – Saint Nicholas of Flüe Day
- 1 November – All Saints' Day
- 8 December – Immaculate Conception
- 25 December – Christmas Day
- 26 December – Saint Stephen's Day
- 31 December – Restoration Day
