= 2024 in Switzerland =

- Decades: 2000s; 2010s; 2020s
- See also: History of Switzerland; Timeline of Swiss history; List of years in Switzerland

Events in the year 2024 in Switzerland.

== Incumbents ==
- President of the Swiss Confederation: Viola Amherd
- President of the National Council: Eric Nussbaumer
- President of the Swiss Council of States: Eva Herzog

== Events ==
=== February ===
- 20 February – In ice hockey, Genève-Servette HC of the Swiss National League wins their first Champions Hockey League title, defeating Skellefteå AIK of the Swedish Hockey League 3–2 in the final.

=== March ===
- 3 March – 2024 Swiss referendums: Voters accept the initiative to increase monthly pensions, but reject raising the retirement age.
- 11 March – Five skiers are found dead after they went missing two days ago en route from Zermatt to the village of Arolla. A sixth person is still missing.
- 30 March–7 April – The 2024 World Men's Curling Championship at Schaffhausen.

=== April ===
- 9 April – The European Court of Human Rights rules that the Swiss government's efforts to tackle climate change are insufficient and violate fundamental human rights, in its first such verdict against a state on the issue, following a lawsuit filed by about 2,500 members of the group Senior Women for Climate Protection.
- 17 April – The Federal Assembly votes to ban public displays of the Nazi swastika.

=== May ===
- 11 May – Swiss singer Nemo wins the Eurovision Song Contest 2024 in Malmö, Sweden with the song The Code.
- 15 May – In a suspected terrorist attack, a man stabs six people in Zofingen.

=== June ===
- 9 June – 2024 Swiss referendums: Voters reject limits on healthcare spending and an initiative against compulsory vaccination, while approving the initiative of a new law on electricity.
- 13 June – Two people are killed and 11 others are injured following a series of explosions inside an underground parking garage at an apartment building in Obersiggenthal.
- 15-16 June – June 2024 Ukraine peace summit: World leaders meet at the Bürgenstock Resort to advance the Ukrainian peace process.
- 21 June – A court in Geneva sentences billionaire Prakash Hinduja and three of his family members to four years in prison for exploiting domestic workers at their villa in Cologny.
- 22 June – One person is killed and two others are reported missing after a rockslide hits the town of Lostallo in Graubünden.
- 25 June – The Parliamentary Assembly of the Council of Europe elects former Swiss president Alain Berset as the Council's new Secretary General, succeeding Marija Pejčinović Burić.
- 30 June – Four people are killed and two are missing after landslides and torrential floods in Ticino and Valais.

=== July ===
- 11 July – Five people are injured in a machete attack inside an apartment in Saint Gallen. The suspect is arrested.
- 12 July – Three people are killed and eight others are injured after scaffolding falls off an under construction building in Lausanne.
- 23 July – The United States invites Sudan's military and the Rapid Support Forces to ceasefire talks in Switzerland on 14 August.

=== August ===
- 28 August – The Federal Criminal Court of Switzerland convicts two PetroSaudi executives to six and seven years in prison respectively for embezzling more than US$1.8 billion from the Malaysian strategic development firm 1Malaysia Development Berhad.
- 30 August – Basel is selected to host the Eurovision Song Contest 2025, defeating a rival bid from Geneva.

=== September ===
- 10 September – A Swiss appeals court convicts Islamic scholar Tariq Ramadan of rape and sexual coercion. He receives a three-year prison sentence, with two years suspended. Ramadan still faces multiple other rape allegations in both Switzerland and France.
- 22 September – 2024 Swiss referendums: Voters reject proposals to increase public funding to create wilderness areas, increase the amount of territory occupied by protected areas and pension reform.
- 23 September – An American woman dies after using a sarco pod to commit assisted suicide in Merishausen, Schaffhausen Canton. Several people are subsequently arrested in connection with the incident.
- 27 September –
  - Cyclist Muriel Furrer dies after sustaining serious head injuries in a crash while participating in the 2024 UCI Road World Championships in Zurich the previous day.
  - Switzerland officially redefines parts of its border with Italy following topographical changes caused by melting glaciers.

=== October ===
- 1 October – Three children are injured in a knife attack at a daycare centre in Oerlikon, Zürich. The suspect, a 23-year old Chinese national, is arrested.

=== November ===
- 24 November – 2024 Swiss referendums: Voters reject proposals for additional road infrastructure and rent changes, while approving changes to healthcare funding. In Basel, 66.4% of voters approve funding additional programs for the Eurovision Song Contest 2025 to be hosted in the city, apart from the event's final.
- 28 November–15 December – The 2024 European Women's Handball Championship at Basel.

=== December ===
- 7 December – Twenty-six people are hospitalised following an incident of carbon monoxide poisoning at a campsite in Giswil.

== Art and entertainment ==
- List of Swiss submissions for the Academy Award for Best International Feature Film

== Holidays ==
- 1 January - New Year's Day
- 2 January - Berchtoldstag Day
- 6 January - Epiphany
- 1 March - Republic Day
- 19 March - Saint Joseph's Day
- 29 March - Good Friday
- 1 April - Easter Monday
- 4 April - Näfels Ride
- 1 May - International Workers' Day
- 9 May - Ascension Day
- 20 May - Whit Monday
- 30 May - Corpus Christi
- 29 June - Saints Peter and Paul
- 1 August - Swiss National Day
- 15 August - Assumption Day
- 5 September - Jeûne genevois
- 15 September - Lundi du Jeûne
- 25 September - Saint Nicholas of Flüe Day
- 1 November - All Saints' Day
- 8 December – Immaculate Conception
- 25 December - Christmas Day
- 26 December – Saint Stephen's Day
- 31 December – Restoration Day

== Deaths ==
- 1 January – Niklaus Wirth, 89, computer scientist (Pascal).
- 6 January – Kurt W. Forster, 88, architecture historian and teacher.
- 14 January – Christophe Boesch, 72, French-Swiss primatologist.
- 20 January – Jacques Guhl, 101, writer, poet, and footballer (Lausanne-Sport, Sion).
- 29 May – Claude Torracinta, 89, Swiss journalist.
- 18 August – Ulrike Hoffmann-Richter, German psychiatrist.
