= Public holidays in Switzerland =

The 26 cantons that make up Switzerland set their public holidays independently – with the exception of 1 August, which is the only federal holiday. Furthermore, holidays can change depending on employers, and some holidays are specific to only a certain town or village. In general, the most reliable list of holidays for a given area will be found in a list of bank shops and offices close during bank holidays.

== Public holidays in each canton ==
Holiday	Variable?	Date	(Aargau) AG	(Appenzell Innerrhoden) AI	(Appenzell Ausserrhoden) AR	(Basel-Landschaft) BL	(Basel-Stadt) BS	(Canton of Bern) BE	(Canton of Fribourg) FR	(Canton of Geneva) GE	(Canton of Glarus) GL	(Grisons) GR	(Canton of Jura) JU	(Canton of Lucerne) LU	(Canton of Neuchâtel) NE	(Nidwalden) NW	(Obwalden) OW	(Canton of St. Gallen) SG	(Canton of Schaffhausen) SH	(Canton of Schwyz) SZ	(Canton of Solothurn) SO	(Thurgau) TG	(Ticino) TI	(Canton of Uri) UR	(Valais) VS	(Vaud) VD	(Canton of Zug) ZG	(Canton of Zurich) ZH	Number of cantons	2026	2027	2028	2029
New Year's Day	N	1 January	check	check	check	check	check	check	check	check	check	check	check	check	check	check	check	check	check	check	check	check	check	check	check	check	check	check	26	1 January 2026	1 January 2027	1 January 2028	1 January 2029
Berchtold's Day	N	2 January	check					check	check		check		check	check	check		check		check		check	check				check	check	check	14	2 January 2026	2 January 2027	2 January 2028	2 January 2029
Epiphany	N	6 January																		check			check	check					3	6 January 2026	6 January 2027	6 January 2028	6 January 2029
Republic Day	N	1 March													check														1	1 March 2026	1 March 2027	1 March 2028	1 March 2029
Saint Joseph's Day	N	19 March														check				check	check		check	check	check				6	19 March 2026	19 March 2027	19 March 2028	19 March 2029
Näfels Ride	N	First Thursday in April									check																		1	First Thursday in April 2026	First Thursday in April 2027	First Thursday in April 2028	First Thursday in April 2029
Good Friday	Y	Easter Sunday – 2 d	check	check	check	check	check	check	check	check	check	check	check	check	check	check	check	check	check	check	check	check		check		check	check	check	24	2026	2027	2028	2029
Easter Monday	Y	Easter Sunday + 1 d	check	check	check	check	check	check	check	check	check	check	check	check		check	check	check	check	check	check	check	check	check		check	check	check	24	6 April 2026	29 March 2027	17 April 2028	2 April 2029
Labour Day	N	1 May				check	check						check		check				check		check	check	check					check	9	1 May 2026	1 May 2027	1 May 2028	1 May 2029
Ascension Day	Y	Easter Sunday + 39 d	check	check	check	check	check	check	check	check	check	check	check	check	check	check	check	check	check	check	check	check	check	check	check	check	check	check	26	14 May 2026	6 May 2027	25 May 2028	10 May 2029
Whit Monday	Y	Easter Sunday + 50 d	check	check	check	check	check	check	check	check	check	check	check	check		check	check	check	check	check	check	check	check	check		check	check	check	24	25 May 2026	17 May 2027	5 June 2028	21 May 2029
Corpus Christi	Y	Easter Sunday + 60 d	check	check					check				check	check		check	check			check	check		check	check	check		check		13	4 June 2026	27 May 2027	15 June 2028	31 May 2029
Saints Peter and Paul	N	29 June																					check						1	29 June 2026	29 June 2027	29 June 2028	29 June 2029
National Day	N	1 August	check	check	check	check	check	check	check	check	check	check	check	check	check	check	check	check	check	check	check	check	check	check	check	check	check	check	26	1 August 2026	1 August 2027	1 August 2028	1 August 2029
Assumption Day	N	15 August		check					check				check	check		check	check			check	check		check	check	check		check		12	15 August 2026	15 August 2027	15 August 2028	15 August 2029
Jeûne genevois	Y	Thursday after First Sunday in September								check																			1	2026	2027	2028	2029
Lundi du Jeûne (Monday after previous)	Y	Day after Third Sunday in September																								check			1	2026	2027	2028	2029
Saint Nicholas of Flüe Day	N	25 September															check												1	25 September 2026	25 September 2027	25 September 2028	25 September 2029
All Saints' Day	N	1 November	check	check					check		check		check	check		check	check	check		check	check		check	check	check		check		15	1 November 2026	1 November 2027	1 November 2028	1 November 2029
Immaculate Conception	N	8 December	check	check					check			check		check		check	check			check			check	check	check		check		13	8 December 2026	8 December 2027	8 December 2028	8 December 2029
Christmas Day	N	25 December	check	check	check	check	check	check	check	check	check	check	check	check	check	check	check	check	check	check	check	check	check	check	check	check	check	check	26	25 December 2026	25 December 2027	25 December 2028	25 December 2029
Saint Stephen's Day	N	26 December	check	check	check	check	check	check	check		check	check		check	check	check	check	check	check	check	check	check	check	check			check	check	21	26 December 2026	26 December 2027	26 December 2028	26 December 2029
Restoration Day	N	31 December								check																			1	31 December 2026	31 December 2027	31 December 2028	31 December 2029
Total number of holidays per canton			12	12	9	9	9	9	14	9	11	11	12	15	9	13	14	9	10	14	15	10	15	14	9	9	13	10					

== Public holidays in specific places, parts of cantons ==
Holiday	Date	Holiday	Partial Holiday
Carnival^{1}	Second Monday before Ash Wednesday		SZ
Carnival^{1}	Thursday before Ash Wednesday	LU, UR, NW	SZ, SG, GR
Carnival^{1}	Monday before Ash Wednesday	GL	ZH, LU, UR, SZ, ZG, SG, AG
Carnival^{1}	Tuesday before Ash Wednesday	SZ, NW, OW	LU, UR, BL, SG, AG, TI
Carnival^{1}	Ash Wednesday	NW	SZ, BL, AR, TI, JU
Carnival^{1}	Friday after Ash Wednesday		TI
Carnival^{1}	Monday after Ash Wednesday	BS	BL (Lower Part Afternoon), ZH
Carnival^{1}	Tuesday after Ash Wednesday		FR
Carnival^{1}	Wednesday after Ash Wednesday	BS	BL (Lower Part Afternoon)
Republic Day	1 March	NE (only)	
Näfels Ride	Usually the first Thursday in April	GL (only)	
Sechseläuten	Usually the third Monday in April (half-day)	Zürich City, Schlieren (only)	
Independence Day	23 June	JU (only)	
Peter and Paul	29 June	TI	LU, GR
Knabenschiessen	Second weekend in September (+ half Monday after)	Zürich City (and Zürich Metro Area) (only)	
Prayer Monday	Monday after Federal Day of Thanksgiving, Repentance and Prayer	Legally recognized only in VD (Lundi du Jeûne)	Also celebrated in NE and parts of BE. Bank holiday in VS.
Mauritius Day	22 September	AI (only) except Oberegg District	
St. Leodegar (Schutzengelfest)	2 October	Lucerne City (only)	
L'Escalade	12 December	GE (only)	

^{1}	The days around Carnival are (with the exception of very few individual municipalities) not public holidays. However, due to widely observed celebrations in the cantons mentioned, there are usually restrictions: for example, businesses might already close at noon or not open at all.

== See also ==
- Liturgical year in Switzerland
