= Battle of Glarus =

Battle of Glarus could refer to:

- Battle of Glarus (1799)
- Battle of Näfels
