= Liturgical year in Switzerland =

Christian traditions and related customs

The liturgical year in Switzerland (German: Kirchenjahr; French: année liturgique) is the succession of Christian feasts celebrated in Switzerland, together with the popular customs that have grown up around them. The cycle follows the natural seasons of Europe and draws on older Jewish (Passover) and Hellenistic traditions, as well as pre-Christian elements that were absorbed into Christian practice. In Switzerland, folk customs and liturgical observances became closely intertwined: liturgical feasts shaped the experience of the seasons, while popular practice shaped the church year in turn. Attempts to develop a distinct Reformed church calendar after the Reformation did not progress beyond a few thematic Sundays, such as Reformation Day on 31 October.

The initiative for shaping local customs often came from the local clergy, and later from schoolteachers. Recurring elements include processions and parades, scenic plays, fires and lights, and decorations of flowers and greenery. Before its modern decline, the church year served as an important framework for coping with the rhythms of existence, contrasting joy and brightness with mourning and darkness.

== Decline and reform ==
From the second half of the 18th century onward, under the influence of the Enlightenment and Josephinism, civil and church authorities sought to reduce the number of feast days. This tendency continued into modern times, despite some new feasts of Marian devotion in the late 19th and early 20th centuries. The liturgical reform of the Second Vatican Council (1963; from 1955–1956 for Holy Week) brought further changes and removed many saints' feasts. The postwar period also saw the major religious feasts become increasingly commercialized.

== Christmas cycle ==
=== Advent ===
A particular liturgy for Advent, which marks the beginning of the liturgical year, is attested in the East from the 4th–5th centuries. The four weeks of expectation align with the experience of shortening days and the anticipation of the Christmas light. In eastern Switzerland especially, lanterns were carried to early-morning Rorate Masses (named after the introit rorate coeli desuper), a custom going back to the Middle Ages.

The Advent wreath came from the north in the 1920s and 1930s and became widespread after the Second World War. From around the same time, more and more localities began to light up their shopping streets in the weeks before Christmas.

=== Saint Nicholas ===
The cult of Saint Nicholas, Bishop of Myra in Turkey (feast on 6 December), spread to Western Europe after the translation of his relics to Bari in 1078. Saint Nicholas (in Alemannic dialect Samichlaus) took on the role of bringer of Christmas gifts, previously held in monastic schools by a child dressed as a bishop.

His companion, called Knecht Ruprecht or Schmutzli in German-speaking Switzerland, emerged from a fusion of an older masked figure and the figure of the gift-bringer. The older figure survives in the Klausjagen of Küssnacht am Rigi, where bearers of large illuminated mitres (called Iffele) perpetuate a custom of secular origin. Many Saint Nicholas societies, both medieval and modern, maintain the tradition; Lucerne's dates from 1496 and Zürich's from 1947. Fribourg celebrates the saint, its patron, with particular splendor.

=== Christmas and New Year ===
Originally a purely religious festival and later a family one, Christmas became a major driver of private consumption during the postwar economic boom. The Midnight Mass, which has had a Protestant counterpart since the 1960s, remains well attended.

The timing of gift-giving has shifted considerably. Before 1800, gifts were exchanged on Saint Nicholas's day among Catholics and on New Year's Day among Protestants. Protestants then began to give them at Christmas (from around 1820 in Basel, for example), in remembrance of the Christ Child.

Several visual traditions arrived in stages. The Christmas tree came from northern Germany in the 19th century, first to German-speaking Switzerland and initially as a single tree adorning the church, the parsonage, or the school; from 1900 it appeared throughout the country. The crèche is older: the Christ Child of the Sarnen crèche dates from the mid-14th century, and in Graubünden crèches spread from the late 17th century, with figures of terracotta, wax, or wood. In eastern Switzerland, the figurines were often pious donations. In parallel, liturgical plays were staged from at least the 14th century, the oldest known being at St. Gallen. From the 1960s onward, grave candles have been lit in cemeteries at Christmas, as on All Saints' Day, in sign of communion with the dead—a custom borrowed from Germany.

New Year's Eve and 1 January have no particular value in the liturgical year, but they took on special importance when the start of the civil year was moved. The transition is marked by masked balls (also in French-speaking Switzerland from around 1900), feasts, fireworks, and the ringing of bells.

=== Epiphany and early-year saints ===
On 5 January, the eve of Epiphany, houses were blessed in rural areas. From the 7th century onward, the letters C+M+B (for Christus mansionem benedicat, "may Christ bless this dwelling") were inscribed on the lintels of doors. The people interpreted them as the initials of the Magi: Caspar, Melchior, and Balthazar. The custom of Sternsingen—children going from house to house carrying a star and singing for alms—has experienced a revival since the 1930s.

The king cake, with its bean, reflects an old French (10th-century) and Jura tradition, brought back into fashion from 1953 by the Swiss Master Bakers and Confectioners' Association. 6 January also marks the beginning of Carnival (the Greiflet at Schwyz: a procession of whip-crackers and bell-ringers).

Saint Anthony the Great—whose attribute is a pig, hence his Alemannic name Säutoni—was invoked against Saint Anthony's fire; his feast on 17 January is the occasion for blessing herds and automobiles, particularly in Ticino. At Candlemas on 2 February, a feast of light in the Catholic Church from the 5th century, candles are blessed. On the feast of Saint Blaise (3 February), candles are lit against ailments of the throat. The blessed bread of Saint Agatha (5 February) protects against fire, storms, and illness—as did the prayer slips to the saint, still composed in the Fricktal in the 1950s.

== Easter cycle ==
=== Lent ===
The Easter cycle begins with the forty days of Lent, starting on Ash Wednesday, when the priest traces a cross of ashes on the foreheads of the faithful in sign of penance. The following Sunday, the beginning of Lent in the Ambrosian valleys, is called north of the Alps Funkensonntag ("spark Sunday") or Alte Fasnacht ("old carnival"); the first spring fires are lit and incandescent wooden discs are thrown (Scheibenschlagen).

The display in churches—including Protestant ones on occasion—of a Lenten veil adorned with biblical scenes had momentarily disappeared in the 19th century but was revived around 1980. The Annunciation (25 March) was formerly celebrated in Lucerne by a procession on the Musegg hill, and was commemorated in Protestant regions long after the Reformation (the Jour de la Dame at Lausanne).

=== Holy Week and Good Friday ===
Holy Week is the high point of Lent. It begins with the Palm Sunday procession (from the 8th century), in which a wooden donkey was often featured—the oldest is at Steinen. Palm Sunday is also the day of confirmation in most Protestant parishes.

On Maundy Thursday, the bells "departed for Rome" according to popular belief: silent, they were replaced by wooden rattles. Good Friday, traditionally a working day in the Catholic tradition (and still so in Ticino), has been a public holiday in Protestant Switzerland since 1860. The churches of eastern Switzerland displayed a Holy Sepulchre, often in trompe-l'œil painting.

Italian Switzerland is fond of Good Friday processions, such as the highly folkloric one at Mendrisio, and of Passion plays, as at Coldrerio. North of the Alps, such plays were also held at Romont from 1456, at Selzach from 1892 to 1972, and at Disentis, Trun, and Sevgein until the mid-20th century.

The popular and often spectacular nocturnal resurrection festival has given way to a more sober service on the evening of Holy Saturday. During Holy Week, butchers paraded decorated fat oxen as a sign of the approaching end of Lent; the custom persisted for a long time, for example at Moudon.

=== Easter and after ===
The egg has been the secular symbol of Easter, the principal feast of Christendom, since the 17th century. Blown out and artistically decorated, it has been the object of special markets and exhibitions since the 1960s.

Quasimodo Sunday, a week after Easter (in German Weisser Sonntag or "White Sunday"), takes its name from the early Church, when the newly baptized wore for the last time the white garments they had received at Easter for their baptism. Since the 18th century, it has been the day of first communion for Swiss Catholics. From the 1920s, girls wore white and boys wore black with a white armband or boutonnière; from the 1970s, all wore the alb.

The Rogation days (processions through the fields), established by Pope Leo III around 800, took place on the three days before Ascension, one of the oldest Christian feasts. From the late Middle Ages, Ascension was the occasion for the "boundary tours" of Basel-Landschaft, the Beromünster cavalcade, and the cantonal pilgrimage of Zug to Einsiedeln. The raising during Mass of a statue of Christ toward the ceiling of the church, condemned in the 18th century, has been preserved at St. Leodegar's in Lucerne and at Schwyz.

The evening devotions of the month of Mary (May) have belonged since the Middle Ages to the most heartfelt popular piety; the indulgences attached to this practice spread it generally in the 19th century.

== Pentecost cycle ==
=== Pentecost and Corpus Christi ===
Celebrated since the 4th century, Pentecost has never been as popular as Christmas and Easter. Spring customs such as the Feuillu in some Geneva localities, or the Pfingstsprüzlig in the Fricktal—where a young man dressed in leaves splashes young women near fountains—have no connection with the Christian meaning of the feast.

Corpus Christi (the second Thursday after Pentecost) was prescribed for the whole Church by Pope Urban IV in 1264 and spread in the 14th century. It includes a great procession in honor of the Blessed Sacrament, reflecting a new attitude toward the Eucharist: humble adoration from outside, rather than the celebration of the Last Supper. This procession combined with traditional field processions. At their most splendid in the Baroque period, with flower-decked altars, garlands, triumphal arches, and mortar fire, these processions remain solemn today at Appenzell Innerrhoden, Fribourg, Kippel, and Visperterminen.

The Saint John's fires (24 June), linked to the summer solstice, have generally disappeared on account of their proximity to the fires of the national day on 1 August.

=== Late-year feasts ===
The feast of the Assumption of Mary (15 August) is attested from the 5th century; the blessing of herbs to protect houses and stables probably dates from the 10th century. The Federal Diet introduced the Federal Day of Prayer on the third Sunday of September in 1832.

From around the year 1000, the whole Church has celebrated All Saints' and All Souls' (1 and 2 November), days of remembrance when the faithful go to the cemetery to adorn the graves.

The payment of rents on St. Martin's Day (11 November) was the occasion for opulent banquets. At the same time of year, processions are held in the cantons of Zürich and Aargau in which illuminated turnips (Räbeliechtli) are carried. Saint Martin's Day has recently tended to be regarded, as in the Rhineland, as the beginning of Carnival.

== Bibliography ==
- Curti, Notker: Volksbrauch und Volksfrömmigkeit im katholischen Kirchenjahr, 1947.
- Geiger, Paul; Weiss, Richard et al.: Atlas der schweizerischen Volkskunde, part 2, commentary, 1950–1995, pp. 1–236, maps 151–191. * Heim, Walter: Volksbrauch im Kirchenjahr heute, 1983.
- Bieritz, Karl-Heinrich: Das Kirchenjahr. Feste, Gedenk- und Feiertage in Geschichte und Gegenwart, 1987.
- Bäumer, Remigius; Scheffczyk, Leo (eds.): Marienlexikon, 6 vols., 1988–1994.
- Macherel, Claude; Steinauer, Jean: L'état de ciel. Portrait de ville avec rite. La Fête-Dieu de Fribourg (Suisse), 1989.
- Strübin, Eduard: Jahresbrauch im Zeitenlauf. Kulturbilder aus der Landschaft Basel, 1991.
- Kern, Peter: Heiliggräber im Bistum St. Gallen. Eine Dokumentation, 1993.
- Mezger, Werner: Sankt Nikolaus. Zwischen Kult und Klamauk. Zur Entstehung, Entwicklung und Veränderung der Brauchformen um einen populären Heiligen, 1993.
- Oehler, Felicitas: Im Kleinen ganz gross. Ostereier, Scherenschnitte und Naive Malerei in der Schweiz, 1997.

== See also ==
- Liturgical year
- Religion in Switzerland
- Swiss folklore
- Public holidays in Switzerland
