= List of mayors of Zofingen =

Coat of arms of Zofingen

This is a list of mayors (Stadtammänner) of Zofingen, Aargau, Switzerland.

Mayor (Stadtammann) of Zofingen
Term	Mayor	Lifespan	Party	Notes
1899–1913	Jakob Kunz	(1837–1914)	FDP/PLR	
1914–1930	Hans Suter	(1860–1930)	FDP/PLR	
1930–1947	Hans Bertschi	(1888–1981)	FDP/PLR	
1948–1953	Adolf Lerch	(1902–1960)	FDP/PLR	
1954–1973	Walther Leber	(1906–1996)	FDP/PLR	
1974–1992	Willy Loretan	(born 1934)	FDP/PLR	
1992–2006	Urs Locher	(born 1940)	FDP/PLR	
2006–2021	Hans-Ruedi Hottiger	(born 1953)	independent	
2022–Present	Christiane Guyer	(born 1963)	Grüne	
