= Buß- und Bettag =

Protestant holiday in Germany

- Observed by: Saxony, Germany
- Date: Second Wednesday before the First Sunday in Advent (20 November 2024; 19 November 2025; 18 November 2026)
- Frequency: annual

Buß- und Bettag (Repentance and Prayer Day) was a public holiday in Germany, and is still a public holiday in Saxony. In Germany, Protestant church bodies of Lutheran, Reformed (Calvinist) and United denominations celebrate a day of repentance and prayer. It is now celebrated on the penultimate Wednesday before the beginning of the Protestant liturgical year on the first Sunday of Advent; in other words, it is the Wednesday that falls between 16 and 22 November. However, it is not a statutory non-working holiday any more, except in the Free State of Saxony. In the Free State of Bavaria, it is a school holiday only.

== Meaning and origin ==
The tradition of repentance and prayer is rooted in the Book of Jonah of the Bible, where God sends out the prophet Jonah (יוֹנָה) in order to announce to the inhabitants of Nineveh that God is to overthrow the city (Book of Jonah 3:4–10):

^{4}And Jonah began to enter into the city a day's journey, and he cried, and said, Yet forty days, and Nineveh shall be overthrown. ^{5}So the people of Nineveh believed God, and proclaimed a fast, and put on sackcloth, from the greatest of them even to the least of them. ^{6}For word came unto the king of Nineveh, and he arose from his throne, and he laid his robe from him, and covered him with sackcloth, and sat in ashes. ^{7}And he caused it to be proclaimed and published through Nineveh by the decree of the king and his nobles, saying, Let neither man nor beast, herd nor flock, taste any thing: let them not feed, nor drink water: ^{8}But let man and beast be covered with sackcloth, and cry mightily unto God: yea, let them turn every one from his evil way, and from the violence that is in their hands. ^{9}Who can tell if God will turn and repent, and turn away from his fierce anger, that we perish not? ^{10}And God saw their works, that they turned from their evil way; and God repented of the evil, that he had said that he would do unto them; and he did it not.

== As a feast day for Protestants ==
In mediaeval times Christians practised two kinds of days of repentance, those scheduled on particular events of emergency and those celebrated on the Ember days. After the Reformation the Protestant congregations continued that tradition. The first day of prayer, scheduled by Emperor Charles V, was celebrated in 1532 by Protestants in the Holy Roman Empire in Strasbourg on the occasion of the Ottoman invasion at the eastern border of the Empire. In the following centuries different feast days of repentance and prayer were fixed within the many different Holy Roman German states of Protestant population.

== As a statutory non-working holiday ==
In 1878 there were, in some Provinces of Prussia and the component German states of the Empire (1871–1918), 47 different such feast days, celebrated on 24 different dates. In 1893 Prussia ended this plurality for the different territorially organised Protestant church bodies within its territory. In all of Prussia the last Wednesday before 23 November, or eleven days before the first Sunday of Advent, was fixed as Day of Repentance and Prayer, being also a statutory holiday. Later Protestant church bodies in other German states followed, and in 1934 it was fixed nationwide for the date now usual.

In 1939 Buß- und Bettag was abolished as a statutory non-working holiday, in order to gain more working days during World War II, and thus it was celebrated on the Sunday following its actual date. After the war Buß- und Bettag was again celebrated on the aforementioned Wednesday, being again a statutory holiday in most states of Germany in all four sectors of Berlin and all four Occupation zones (except the Free State of Bavaria in the American zone). In 1952 also predominantly Catholic Bavaria made Buß- und Bettag a statutory non-working holiday — first only in its predominantly Lutheran counties, as of 1981 in all the Free State. In 1966 Buß- und Bettag was abolished in the communist East German Democratic Republic and in East Berlin as statutory non-working holiday in the course of reducing the working week to five days.

After 3 October 1990, the day of unification of East Germany, East and West Berlin with the West German Federal Republic of Germany, Buß- und Bettag became a statutory non-working holiday in the East German states again.

In 1994 the Federal Government of Germany passed a law organising the financing of the federal nursing care insurance. It needed more funds, thus the federal government proposed to increase the working time of the German labour force by one day, without a corresponding increase in wages; the revenue from the additional unpaid labour day was used to secure the financing of the federal nursing care insurance. For this purpose the federal government, then led by the Christian Democratic Union (CDU), proposed to the German states, which have the power to define religious feast days as statutory non-working holidays, to abolish the Protestant Buß- und Bettag as a statutory non-working holiday. All German states agreed, except for the Free State of Saxony, which chose instead a higher charge on labour revenues, so that only there Buß- und Bettag remained a statutory non-working holiday as of 1995. In Bavaria Buß- und Bettag remained a day off in all schools and most kindergartens.

== See also ==
- Days of humiliation and thanksgiving
- Switzerland's Federal Day of Thanksgiving, Repentance and Prayer
