= 2025 Swiss referendums =

- 9 February 2025

Environmental Responsibility
For	30%
Against	70%
- 28 September 2025

Federal Decree on Cantonal Property Taxes on Second Homes
For	58%
Against	42%

e-ID Act
For	50.4%
Against	49.6%
- 30 November 2025

Civic Duty Initiative
For	16%
Against	84%

Initiative for a Future
For	22%
Against	78%

Several referendums were held in Switzerland during 2025, with national votes on 9 February, 28 September and 30 November.

== February referendum ==
Only one popular initiative made it to the ballot for this first poll of the year, the "Environmental Responsibility Initiative", supported by the youth branch of Green Party. If accepted, Switzerland would have ten years to reduce consumption and economic activity to "sustainable levels". The initiative did not indicate how these objectives should be met.

Both the Federal Council and Parliament recommended voters to reject the initiative, which ended up being soundly defeated.

=== Results ===
Question	For			Against			Invalid/ blank	Total votes	Registered voters	Turnout	Outcome
Question	Votes	%	Cantons	Votes	%	Cantons	Invalid/ blank	Total votes	Registered voters	Turnout	Outcome
Environmental Responsibility	639,005	30.25	0 0/2	1,473,529	69.75	20 6/2	25,384	2,137,918	5,618,325	38.05	Rejected
Source: Federal Chancellery

== September referendums ==
Two referendums were subject to vote on 28 September 2025: electronic identity and property tax. Both referendums were approved, although the former on electronic identity passed very narrowly with 50.4% for and 49.6% against, while the latter regarding property tax on secondary properties had 57.7% of votes in favor to 42.3% against. The government (including both houses of the Federal Assembly) supported the plans for the electronic identity cards, and it was expected by pollsters that there would be stronger support for the proposal.

In Zurich, a motion to ban the use of petrol-fuelled leaf blowers and leaf vacuums due to concerns over noise and air pollution was passed with 61% of voters in favor, while in Thurgau, a motion to lift a ban on secular events on five religious holidays was passed by a majority of 51.1%.

=== Results ===
Question	For			Against			Invalid/ blank	Total votes	Registered voters	Turnout	Outcome
Question	Votes	%	Cantons	Votes	%	Cantons	Invalid/ blank	Total votes	Registered voters	Turnout	Outcome
Federal Decree on Cantonal Property Taxes on Secondary Properties	1,579,379	57.73	14 5/2	1,156,98	42.27	6 1/2	58,158	2,794,135	5,641,294	49.53	Approved
Federal Act on Electronic Proof of Identity and Other Electronic Evidence (E-ID Act, BGEID)	1,384,586	50.39	7 1/2	1,363,362	49.61	13 5/2	48,949	2,796,897	5,641,294	49.58	Approved
Source: Federal Chancellery, opendata.swiss

== November referendums ==
Two referendums were held on 30 November 2025: "Civic Duty Initiative" and "Initiative for a Future". Voters were asked on whether to replace compulsory military service for males with compulsory civic duty for both genders, and whether to impose new taxes on the super-rich to finance efforts against climate change. Both referendums were rejected.

=== Results ===
Question	For			Against			Invalid/ blank	Total votes	Registered voters	Turnout	Outcome
Question	Votes	%	Cantons	Votes	%	Cantons	Invalid/ blank	Total votes	Registered voters	Turnout	Outcome
Civic Duty Initiative	379,638	15.85	0 0/2	2,014,886	84.15	20 6/2	31,326	2,425,580	5,648,860	42.94	Rejected
Initiative for a Future	520,115	21.72	0 0/2	1,874,063	78.28	20 6/2	31,991	2,426,465	5,648,860	42.95	Rejected
Source: Federal Chancellery, opendata.swiss

== See also ==
- Swiss referendums by year:
  - 2024
  - 2025
  - 2026
