= Willy Loretan =

Swiss politician (1934–2026)

Willy Loretan (15 June 1934 – 22 February 2026) was a Swiss politician.

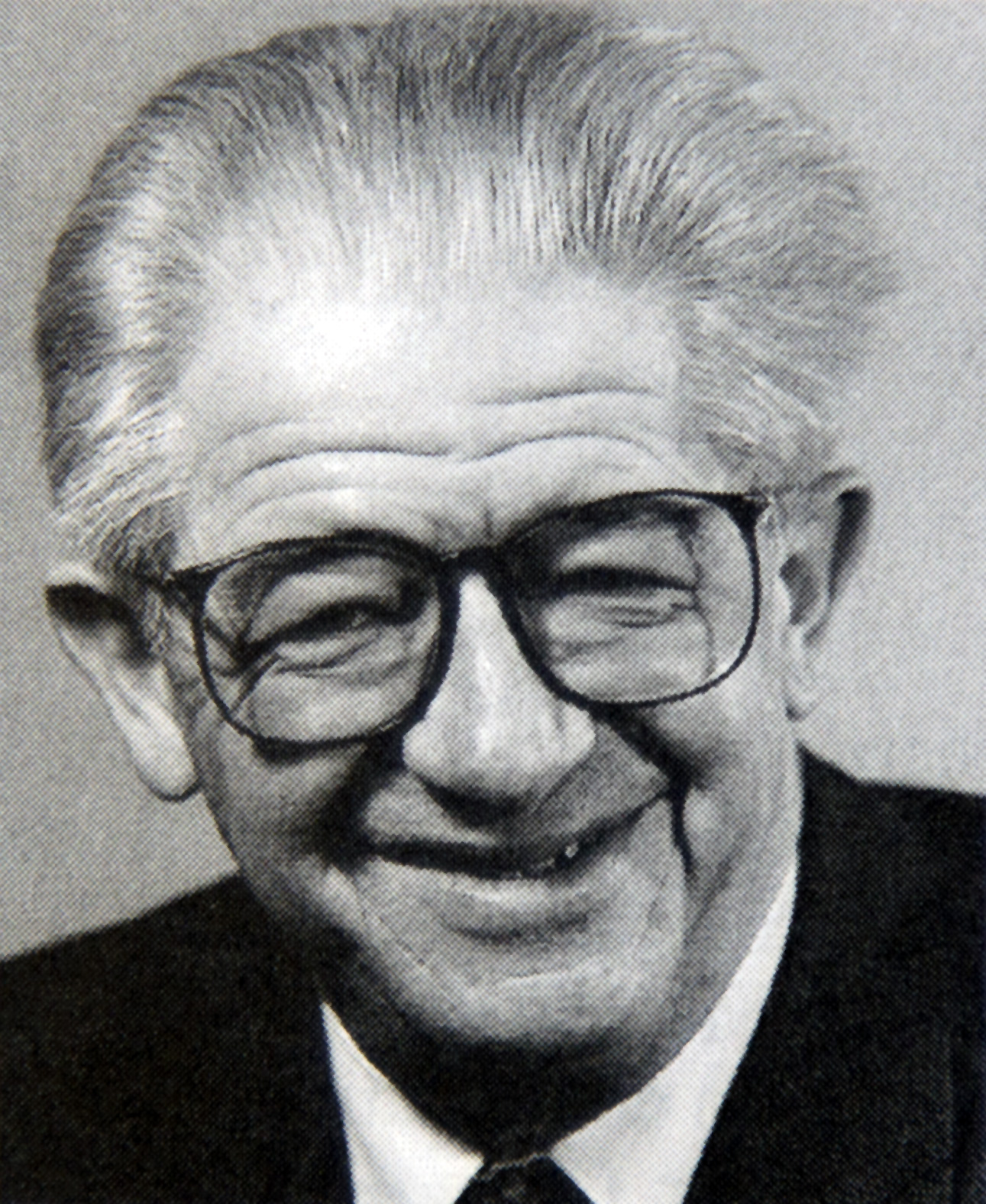
Willy Loretan

== Life and career ==
Loretan was born in Basel on 15 June 1934. His political career began in 1966 with his election to the Zofingen Residents' Council. From 1969 to 1981, he was a member of the Grand Council of the Canton of Aargau, where he was parliamentary group president of the FDP. From 1974 to 1992, he was mayor of Zofingen. In 1979, he was elected to the National Council, followed by election to the Council of States in 1991. Eight years later, he retired from politics. Loretan chaired the Swiss Foundation for Landscape Protection from 1982 to 1992 and the Swiss Civil Defence Association from 1996 to 2001.

Loretan died on 22 February 2026, at the age of 91.
