= Conscription in Switzerland =

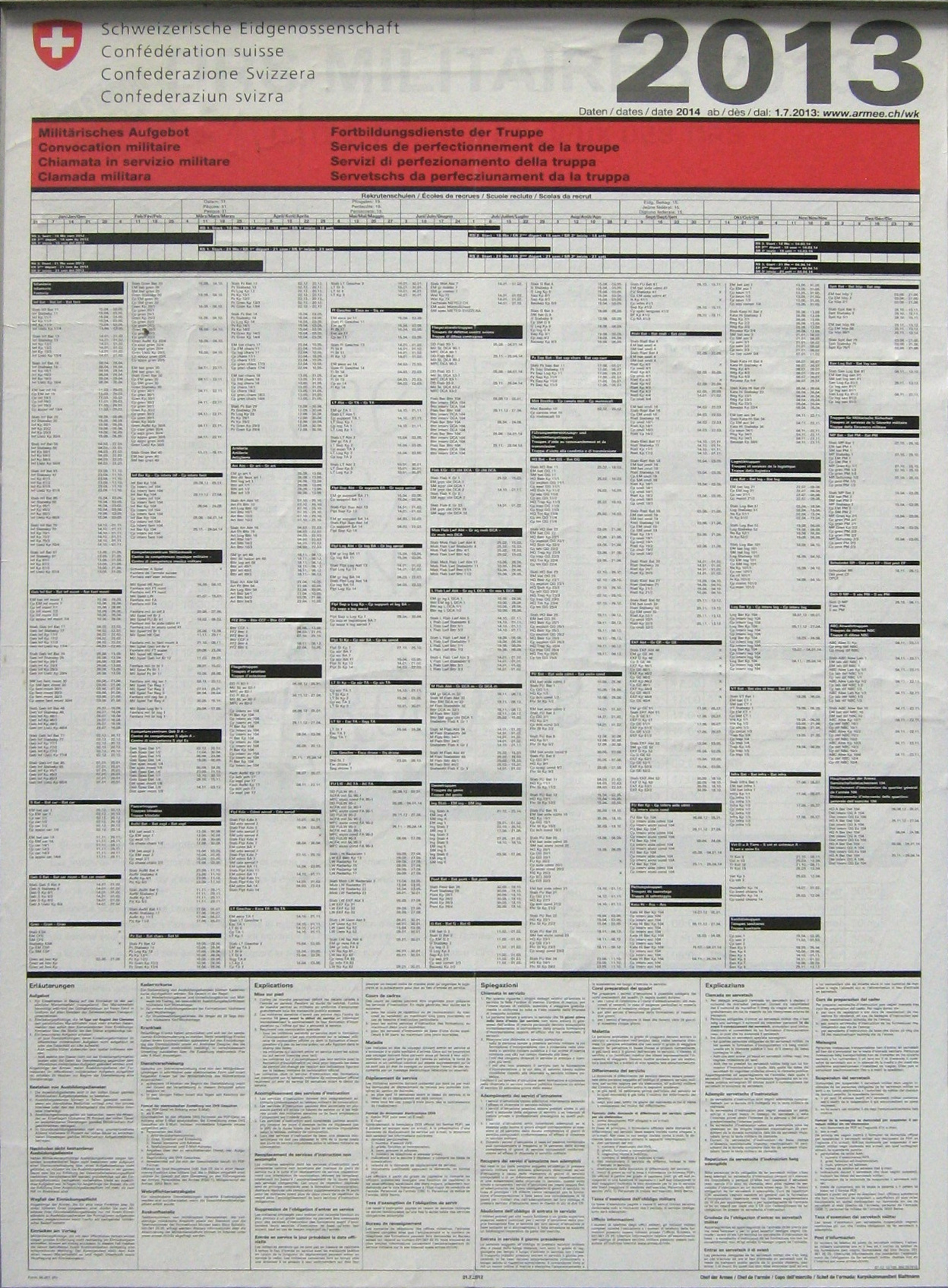
Timetable of military duties, Switzerland.

Switzerland has mandatory service (German: Militärdienst / Zivildienst; French: service militaire / service civil; Italian: servizio militare / servizio civile) in the Swiss Army or Civilian Service for all able-bodied male citizens, who are conscripted when they reach the age of majority. Women may volunteer for any position. Conscripts make up the majority of the manpower in the Swiss Armed Forces.

On September 22, 2013, a referendum that aimed to abolish conscription was held in Switzerland. However, the referendum failed with over 73% of the electorate voting against it, showing strong support for conscription of men in Switzerland.

On November 30, 2025, a referendum called the Civic Duty Initiative was held, which would have replaced compulsory military service for males with compulsory civic duty for both genders. However the referendum failed with more than 84% of voters voting against it.

== Recruitment ==
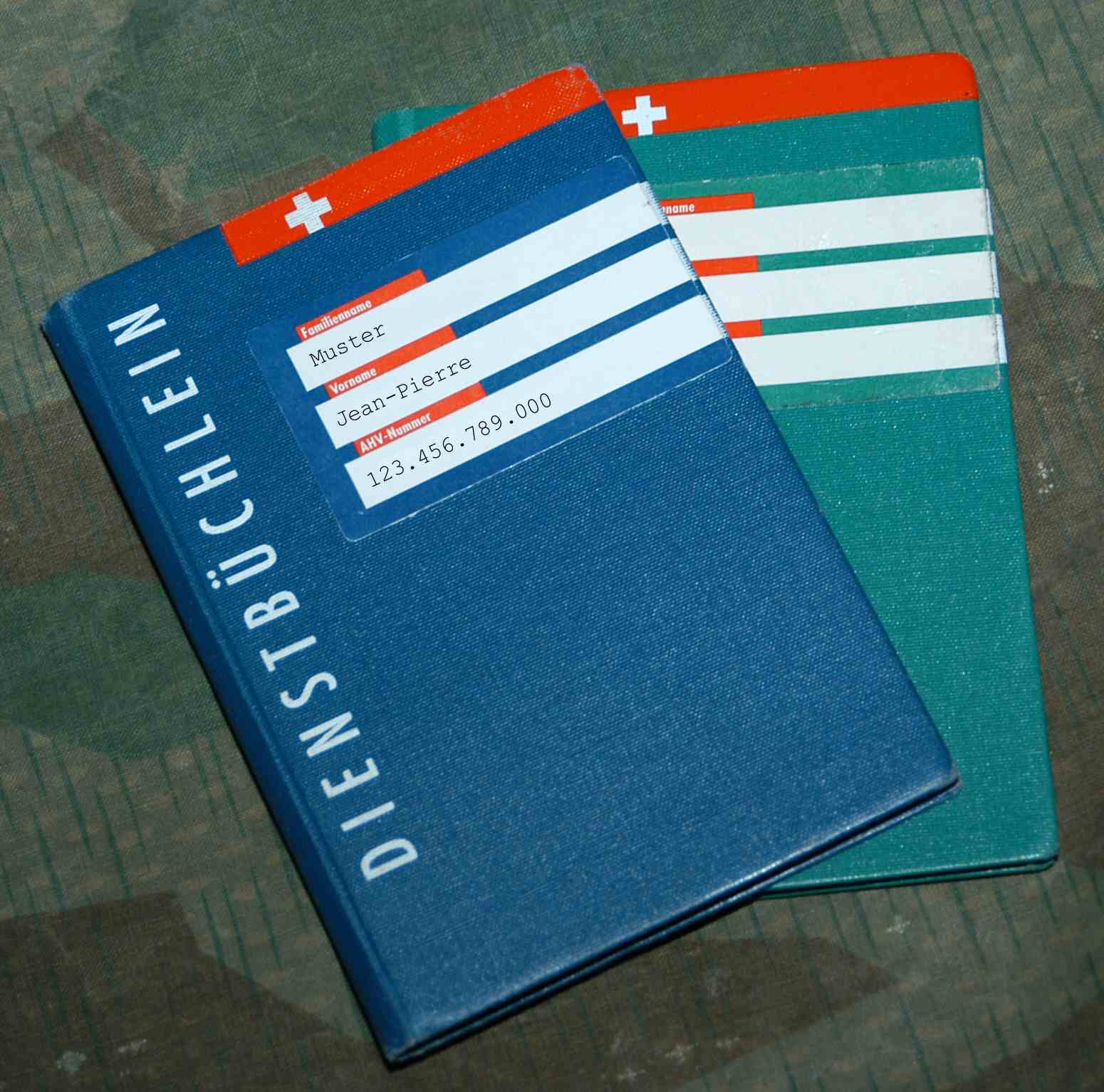
Service record book

Service in the army or civil protection usually begins at the age of 20, but recruitment may commence as early as 16 for those interested in preparatory courses, which are a precondition for gaining access to some sectors of the armed forces.

After the first written communications, all the male conscripts (for which attendance is mandatory) and female volunteers are convoked for an information day (German: Orientierungstag; French: Journée d’information; Italian: Giornata informativa), usually taking place near the municipality of residence of the attendants. During this day they are given a presentation of the army, the civil protection, Switzerland's security policy, an overview of their rights and duties and administrative directives.

On this occasion conscripts are issued a service record book, used to attest the fulfilment of military obligations. It is possible to postpone service up to four years given adequate reasons (e.g. study abroad). Any further delaying of service could incur fines. Conscripts are advised to either carry out their service in a single long stretch or to fraction their time by undergoing recruit training first and serving in a later phase.

Recruitment itself takes place over a period of two or three days in one of the six recruitment centres spread across Switzerland (Windisch, Payerne, Sumiswald, Monte Ceneri, Rüti, Mels). Recruits are assigned different positions according to their physical fitness, intellectual capabilities and aptitude.

Military service is not mandatory for women, but they may volunteer for any position. In 2016, an expert commission that the Swiss government charged with reviewing the country's conscription system recommended that women be included in the military draft in order to meet its annual demand of 18,000 new soldiers a year.

=== Exemption ===
Men determined unfit for service, where fitness is defined as "satisfying physical, intellectual and mental requirements for military service or civil protection service and being capable of accomplishing these services without harming oneself or others", are exempted from service but pay an additional 3% of annual income tax until the age of 37 but for a maximum of 11 years, unless they are affected by a severe disability.

Almost 20% of all conscripts were found unfit for military or civilian service in 2008; the rate is generally higher in urban cantons such as Zurich and Geneva than in the rural ones. Swiss citizens living abroad are generally exempted from conscription in time of peace, while dual citizenship grants the individual the option to do his military service abroad, instead of in Switzerland.

=== Alternatives to military service ===
Since 1996, conscripts who are found to be sufficiently fit for regular military service, but who object for reasons of conscience, can apply for civilian service. This service consists of various kinds of social services, such as reconstructing cultural sites, helping the elderly and other activities removed from military connotations. Civilian service lasts 340 days, 50% longer than a soldier's regular army service.

Conscripts found to be sufficiently unfit for regular military service, but not for exemption, take part in civil protection, where they serve 245 days (but a maximum of 66 days per year) and may be called on to assist the police, fire or health departments, as well as natural disaster relief and crowd control during demonstrations or events with large attendance. Each day served lowers the exemption tax for that year by 4% until it reaches 0.

== Army service ==
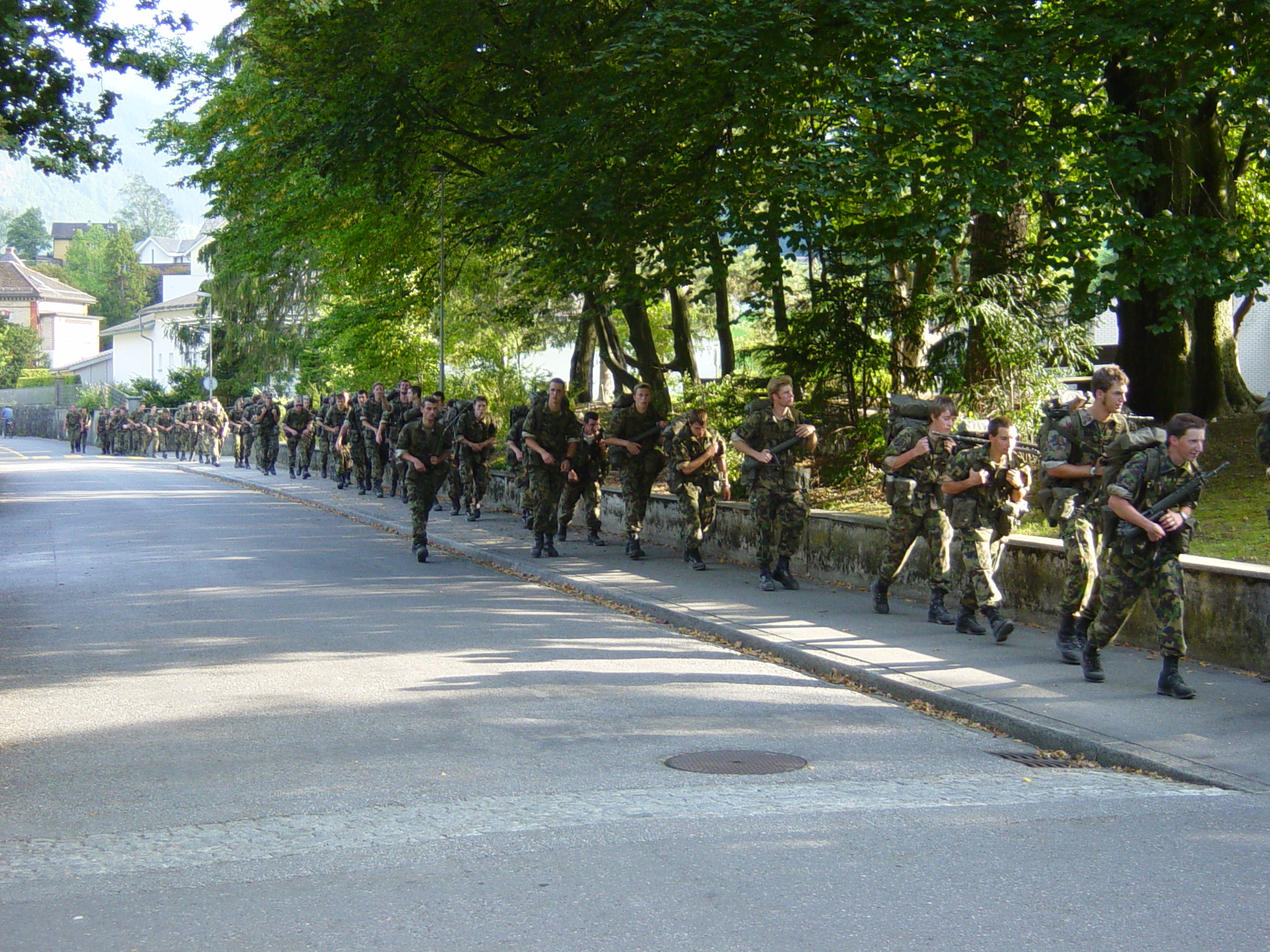
A Swiss Army exercise near Glarus

=== Boot camp ===
Boot camp lasts 18 or 21 weeks. In the first seven weeks recruits receive the "general basic instructions".

The second phase of six weeks is devoted to function-specific basic instructions, where recruits learn skills specific to their job. In the third phase, called "instruction in formation", battlegroups and battalions are formed.

Every Swiss soldier used to be issued with a sealed box of ammunition, but following a Swiss Federal Parliament decision to discontinue the practice in 2007, ammunition have been withdrawn starting in early 2008. Conscripts who are unwilling to carry a weapon on moral grounds may apply for weaponless service.

Recruits seeking higher ranks will require further training:

- the grade of sergeant requires 4 weeks of rank-specific instructions, 1 week of boot camp preparation and 18 weeks of practical service – normally as an instructor at boot camp for new recruits;
- the grade of sergeant-major requires the training for the grade of sergeant, but after 14 weeks of practical service as a sergeant, there are 6 weeks of rank-specific instructions and then again as a sergeant-major 1 week of boot camp preparation and 18 weeks of practical service;
- the grade of lieutenant requires the training for the grade of sergeant, but after 7 weeks of practical service as a sergeant, there are 15 weeks of rank-specific instructions and then again as a lieutenant 1 week of boot camp preparation and 18 weeks of practical service.

The age and duration after when military obligations end also varies with rank, ranging from 12 years for enlisted men and NCOs to 50 for staff officers. Professional officers retire between 58 and 65.

=== Long service ===
Conscripts choosing long service fulfill their entire military obligations in a continuous 300-day service, after which they are incorporated in the reserve for the following seven years. A maximum of 15% of conscripts of any age class has the possibility to choose this path.

== Compensation ==
As of 2017, all personnel are paid a basic compensation ranging from 4 Swiss francs a day for a recruit to CHF 30 for a lieutenant general. This is further supplemented by an additional compensation ranging from 23 to 80 Swiss francs for non-commissioned officers or officers undergoing training.

During military service, military personnel are further paid an income-loss insurance (German, EO, Erwerbsersatzordnung; French, APG, Allocation pour perte de gain). This "EO" is financed with social contributions levied on salaries.

For employees, the "EO" consists in a compensation of 80% of their regular salary. Most employers, however, continue to pay the full salary during military service. In this case, the compensation is paid to the employer. Employers cannot fire a person in service by law, although there is no specific provision preventing a conscript from being fired before or after a period of service, other than the catch-all law against wrongful termination.

Students, independents or unemployed persons receive a fixed compensation of CHF 62, although this compensation amounts to CHF 97 for non-commissioned and commissioned officers while undergoing training. This "EO" can be further improved to a maximum CHF 174 if one has children.

== Further mandatory services ==
The political system in Switzerland is characterized by the so-called militia-system, where civilian service tasks basically are carried out on a part-time basis. Therefore there is a mandatory service for Compulsory Fire Services and in Swiss civil defense and protection institutions for all inhabitants as well.
