= Claude-Inga Barbey =

Swiss comedian, actress and writer (1961–2026)

- Born: 21 January 1961; Geneva, Switzerland
- Died: 3 January 2026 (aged 64)
- Education: École supérieure d'art dramatique de Genève
- Occupations: Comedian, actress, writer

Claude-Inga Barbey (21 January 1961 – 3 January 2026) was a Swiss comedian, actress and writer.

== Early life and career ==
Born in Geneva on 21 January 1961, Barbey was adopted by her great-aunt at the age of three after her alcoholic and drug-addicted parents abandoned her. She only reconnected with her mother later in life, shortly before her mother's passing. During her childhood, she discovered the puppet show "Les Marionnettes de Genève", founded by Marcelle Moynier. She later stole money from her aunts to go see more shows, including The Snow Queen. She studied at the École supérieure d'art dramatique de Genève from 1978 to 1980 and joined radio shows on Radio Suisse Romande in the 1990s.

In 1996, Barbey co-created the program Bergamote alongside Patrick Lapp. The first theatrical showing occurred in 1998, which notably appeared at the Théâtre Hébertot in Paris in 2000. She continued to star in productions for much of her career and notably was awarded Best Supporting Actress for her role in Anomalia at the 2016 Solothurn Film Festival. In 2018, she made her debut as a cleaning lady in the internet series Olé. In March 2021, she created a sketch on gender fluidity titled "TOC ! Le langage épicène pour les nul.le.s", which was published on the website of the newspaper Le Temps. However, the piece received backlashed due to perceived transphobia, which sparked a debate on Radio Télévision Suisse. After one of her sketches published on 23 December 2021 was perceived as racist, she announced the end of her column in Le Temps and her withdrawal from social media.

== Personal life and death ==
Barbey was the mother of four children, having been married to her husband for 17 years prior to their divorce. In 2017, her ex-husband was killed in a traffic collision in Geneva's Old Town. She lived in Meyrin for much of her adult life. She was baptized at the age of 45 after claiming to have communicated with God telepathically.

Barbey died on 3 January 2026, at the age of 64.

== Filmography ==
- L'Ogre de Barbarie (1981)
- The Death of Mario Ricci (1983)
- Noces de soufre (1984)

== Publications ==
- Petite Dépression centrée sur le Jardin (2000)
- Le Palais de Sucre (2003)
- Le Portrait de Madame Mélo et autres nouvelles (2004)
- Les Petits Arrangements (2007)
- 50 nuances de regrets (2019)
- Poussières du Sahara (2022)
