= Werner Ferrari =

Swiss serial killer (1946–2025)

- Born: 29 December 1946; Switzerland
- Died: 12 December 2025 (aged 78); Lenzburg, Switzerland
- Conviction: Murder
- Penalty: Life imprisonment

Details
- Victims: 5
- Span of crimes: 1971–1989
- Country: Switzerland

Werner Ferrari (29 December 1946 – 12 December 2025) was a Swiss serial killer. As a fivefold child murderer, he was one of the most infamous criminals in Switzerland. His method was to kidnap or lure children away from popular festivals, abuse some of them, and then strangle them.

== Youth and first conviction ==
Ferrari was born in Switzerland on 29 December 1946. He grew up in various nurseries and was considered an introvert. He did various jobs as a labourer.

In 1971, Ferrari committed his first murder in Reinach, Basel-Landschaft. There, he murdered 10-year-old Daniel Schwan. Ferrari was sentenced to 10 years imprisonment and was released after eight years from the Zurich detention centre in Regensdorf.

== Killings ==
Between May 1980 and August 1989, eleven children between the ages of six and 14 were abducted in eight different Swiss cantons. Eight were brutally murdered, and three are still missing today: Peter Roth, age eight, from Mogelsberg; Sarah Oberson, age six, from Saxon; and Edith Trittenbass, age nine, from Wetzikon in the Canton of Zurich. The criminal investigation of Ferrari is considered the longest-running in Swiss history, with a duration of almost ten years.

On 30 August 1989, four days after the murder of Fabienne Imhof, Ferrari called the police over the telephone to report that he had nothing to do with her death. Shortly thereafter, he was arrested in his apartment in Olten, and he confessed to four murders. However, Ferrari vehemently denied involvement in the murder of 12-year-old Ruth Steinmann, whose body was found on 16 May 1980 in a wooded area near Würenlos.

== Arrest and trial ==
In 1995, Ferrari was sentenced by the Baden District Court to life imprisonment for five murders, including that of Steinmann. Seven years later, research by journalist and author Peter Holenstein reported evidence that Ferrari could not be responsible for Steinmann's murder. Among other things, DNA analysis revealed that pubic hair found on Steinmann's body did not match Ferrari's.

Due to Holenstein's research, the Canton of Aargau's Supreme Court overturned the 2004 conviction against Ferrari in the Steinmann case, transferring it to the Baden District Court for legal reassessment. As a result, a different suspect who had committed suicide in Wolfhalden in March 1983 was scrutinised. A dental report by the Scientific Service of the Zurich City Police revealed that bite marks on the girl's body were not Ferrari's but came from the other suspect, who had a similar physical description. In a nationwide review of criminal cases, Ferrari was acquitted of Ruth Steinmann's murder on 10 April 2007 by the Baden District Court; however, he remained imprisoned for four other murders.

== The victims ==
- Daniel Schwan (died 1971 in Reinach, 10 years old)
- Benjamin Egli (died 1983, 10 years old) from Kloten
- Daniel Suter (died 1985, 7 years old) from Rümlang
- Christian Widmer (died 1987, 10 years old) from Windisch
- Fabienne Imhof (died 1989 in Hägendorf, 9 years old).

== Death ==
Ferrari died in the Lenzburg Correctional Centre, Switzerland, on 12 December 2025, at the age of 78.

== Literature ==
- Peter Holenstein: The Unbelievable. The Murderous Life of Werner Ferrari.Oesch Verlag AG, Zürich 2002, ISBN 3-0350-2001-9.

== Documentation ==
- Daniela Dardel: The child murderer Werner Ferrari. From the series of criminal cases that moved Switzerland. SF 2007. (Online-Video, 35 Minutes).

== See also ==
- List of serial killers by country
