= Claude Torracinta =

Swiss Journalist (1934–2024)

- Born: Claude Torracinta; 11 November 1934; Le Havre, France
- Died: 29 May 2024 (aged 89)
- Occupation: Journalist
- Years active: 1960–2020
- Children: 2

Claude Torracinta (11 November 1934 – 29 May 2024) was a French-born Swiss journalist that worked for Télévision Suisse Romande from 1969 to 2003.

From 1960 to 1969 he worked for the daily newspaper Tribune de Genève, first as head of the business section (1960–1963), then as head of the general news (1963–1966) and finally as correspondent in Paris (1966–1969). Torracinta died on 29 May 2024, at the age of 89.
