= Bernie Constantin =

Swiss songwriter and radio show host (1947–2025)

- Born: 18 June 1947; Ayent, Valais, Switzerland
- Died: 2 January 2025 (aged 77); Anzère, Valais, Switzerland
- Occupation(s): Songwriter; Radio show host

Bernie Constantin (18 June 1947 – 2 January 2025) was a Swiss songwriter and radio show host.

== Life and career ==
Born in Ayent on 18 June 1947, Constantin joined his first band, Les Anges Blancs, in the 1960s. The band was named after the wrestler L'Ange Blanc. After a performance at the Swiss National Exhibition in Lausanne, he abandoned his studies in the graphic arts in 1964. He then met musician Brian Jones and took part in a BBC show in Montreux. He then traveled to the United States, where he met Frank Zappa. In the late 1970s, he returned to Switzerland, where he opened a bistro called Funky Pétard. In the 1980s, he became more well-known, releasing the songs "Switzerland Reggae" and "Lola Berlingot", which sold 275,000 and 250,000 discs, respectively.

Every Thursday from 2005 to 2012, Constantin hosted the radio show Les Jeudis de Bernie, broadcast on RTS Couleur 3. He was often nicknamed the "Alpine Iguana" due to his resemblance to Iggy Pop and a young Mick Jagger. His son, Jessie Kobel, was a comedian and hosted Get Up, Stand Up, which prompted an invitation to the Festival Morges Sous-rire in 2016. In the summer of 2024, Constantin joined his son on the radio show Mon bel été en Suisse, broadcast on RTS Première.

Constantin died in Anzère on 2 January 2025, at the age of 77.

== Publications ==
- Ma vie en rock au pays du rhododendron (2022)
- Preface of Nouvelleaks : les chroniques du nouvelliste : 2010-2013 by Slobodan Despot (2014)
