= Jacques Basler =

Swiss architect (1942–2026)

Jacques Basler (6 February 1942 – 13 March 2026) was a Swiss sculptor.

== Life and career ==
Basler was born in Lausanne on 6 February 1942.

He was active from the 1970s until his death in 2026, specializing in bronze casting and attributable to the line of modern European sculpture that favors form, material and manual skills.

The Elart Swiss gallery describes Basler as "the most gifted Swiss sculptor of his generation". His bronze works combine flexibility and entêtement, fragility and strength, curves and sharp angles, with filiform figures reminiscent of Alberto Giacometti.

Basler spent long periods on the island of Filicudi, in the Aeolian Islands, where he owned a house-atelier located in the Pecorini area, reachable in the Fossetta district. The residence, immersed in the volcanic landscape of the island, became over the years a meeting place for artists, friends and visitors.

Basler died on 13 March 2026, at the age of 84.
