= 2026 Swiss referendums =

Several referendums were held in Switzerland during 2026, with national votes on 8 March, 14 June, 27 September and one planned for 29 November.

== March ==
2026 Swiss referendums
- 8 March 2026

"Cash is freedom" initiative
For	46%
Against	54%

Counter-proposal to the cash initiative
For	73%
Against	27%

SBC initiative
For	38%
Against	62%

Climate Fund initiative
For	29%
Against	71%

Individual taxation
For	54%
Against	46%
- 14 June 2026

"No to ten-million Switzerland" initiative
For	45%
Against	55%

Amendment to the Civilian Service Act
For	52%
Against	48%
- 27 September 2026

Neutrality Initiative
For	30%
Against	70%

Food Initiative
For	27%
Against	73%

Four referendums were held on 8 March: Initiatives on cash, public broadcasting, a climate fund and individual taxation.

The voters were asked whether to cap the annual license fee for the Swiss Broadcasting Corporation at 200 francs while exempting other companies from the levy, whether to introduce individual taxation requiring married couples to file separate tax returns, whether to create a federal climate fund, and whether to protect cash in the constitution by guaranteeing that coins and banknotes remain in circulation.

One referendum on the individual taxation passed, and also the counter-proposal for the initiative on cash passed, which sets a mandate to protect access to cash, while avoiding rigid constitutional limits on payments, while the rest of referendums were rejected. Had both the popular initiative and the counter-proposal been approved, the conflict would have been resolved through the additional tie-breaker question that was voted on concurrently with the other five questions. In that vote, the counter-proposal received 1,841,208 votes, compared with 1,098,341 for the original initiative.

=== Results ===
Question	For			Against			Invalid/ blank	Total votes	Registered voters	Turnout	Outcome
Question	Votes	%	Cantons	Votes	%	Cantons	Invalid/ blank	Total votes	Registered voters	Turnout	Outcome
"Cash is freedom" initiative	1,381,191	45.61	9 0/2	1,646,845	54.39	11 6/2	52,297	3,080,333	5,656,176	54.46	Rejected
Counter-proposal to the cash initiative	2,169,303	73.41	20 6/2	785,763	26.59	0 0/2	52,297	3,007,362	5,656,176	55.37	Approved
SBC initiative	1,188,459	38.05	0 0/2	1,934,819	61.95	20 6/2	34,191	3,157,469	5,656,176	55.82	Rejected
Climate Fund initiative	897,355	29.29	0 0/2	2,165,868	70.71	20 6/2	80,321	3,143,544	5,656,176	55.58	Rejected
Individual taxation	1,662,477	54.26	9 2/2	1,401,322	45.74	11 4/2	85,973	3,149,672	5,656,176	55.69	Approved
Source: Federal Chancellery, opendata.swiss

== June ==
Two referendums were held on 14 June. One of them, "No to ten million Switzerland", sought to cap the country's permanent resident population at 10 million by 2050. It was promoted by the Swiss People's Party. The other sought to reduce the number of people switching to civilian alternatives to their compulsory military service.

Referendum on capping the country's permanent resident population was rejected, while amendment to the Civilian Service Act has passed.

=== No to ten million Switzerland ===
The results of the referendum on No to ten million Switzerland by canton. Red indicates opposition and green supports

A December 2025 poll found that 48% of respondents were in favor of the initiative, while 41% said they were against it. (Note: 88% of Swiss People's Party (SVP) supporters supported it; 42% of The Centre voters supported it, while 43% were against it; and 46% of FDP.The Liberals supporters supported it, while 38% opposed it. 73% of Social Democratic Party of Switzerland and 72% of Green Party of Switzerland supporters opposed it.) A September 2025 poll found that 48% of respondents were in favor of the initiative, while 45% said they were against it.

During the campaign the (SVP) Swiss People's Party, (EDU) Federal Democratic Union of Switzerland, (MCG) Geneva Citizens' Movement and Swiss Democrats supported the Yes vote.

(EVP) Evangelical People's Party of Switzerland, (FDP) The Liberals, (GLP) Green Liberal Party of Switzerland, (GPS) Green Party of Switzerland, Centre, (PdA) Swiss Party of Labour and (SP) Social Democratic Party of Switzerland supported the No vote.

=== Results ===
Question	For			Against			Invalid/ blank	Total votes	Registered voters	Turnout	Outcome
Question	Votes	%	Cantons	Votes	%	Cantons	Invalid/ blank	Total votes	Registered voters	Turnout	Outcome
"No to ten-million Switzerland" initiative	1,492,857	45.21	8 4/2	1,809,246	54.79	12 2/2	34,734	3,336,837	5,669,113	58.86	Rejected
Amendment to the Civilian Service Act	1,690,622	52.46	17 5/2	1,532,160	47.54	3 1/2	80,298	3,303,080	5,669,113	58.26	Approved
Source: Federal Statistical Office, opendata.swiss

== September ==
The government has decided to put two proposals to a public vote on 27 September 2026:

- Popular initiative ‘Safeguarding Swiss neutrality (neutrality initiative)’;
- Popular initiative ‘For safe food – through strengthening sustainable domestic production, increasing plant-based foods and ensuring clean drinking water (food initiative)’.

Both referendums were rejected by a wide margin.

The (SVP) Swiss People's Party supported the Yes vote for the Swiss neutrality initiative.

=== Results ===
Question	For			Against			Invalid/ blank	Total votes	Registered voters	Turnout	Outcome
Question	Votes	%	Cantons	Votes	%	Cantons	Invalid/ blank	Total votes	Registered voters	Turnout	Outcome
Neutrality Initiative	789,130	29.85	0 0/2	1,854,767	70.15	20 6/2				47.06	Rejected
Food Initiative	723,142	27.48	0 0/2	1,908,368	72.52	20 6/2				47.03	Rejected
Source: Federal Statistical Office

== November ==
The government has decided to put four proposals to a public vote on 29 November 2026:

- Federal decree of 19 June 2026 on additional funding for the AVS through an increase in VAT;
- Popular initiative ‘For a restriction on fireworks’;
- Popular initiative ‘Yes to fair federal taxation for married couples – To finally put an end to marriage discrimination!’;
- Amendment of 19 December 2025 to the Federal Act on War Material (LFMG).
