= Berchtoldstag =

Swiss and Liechtensteiner holiday

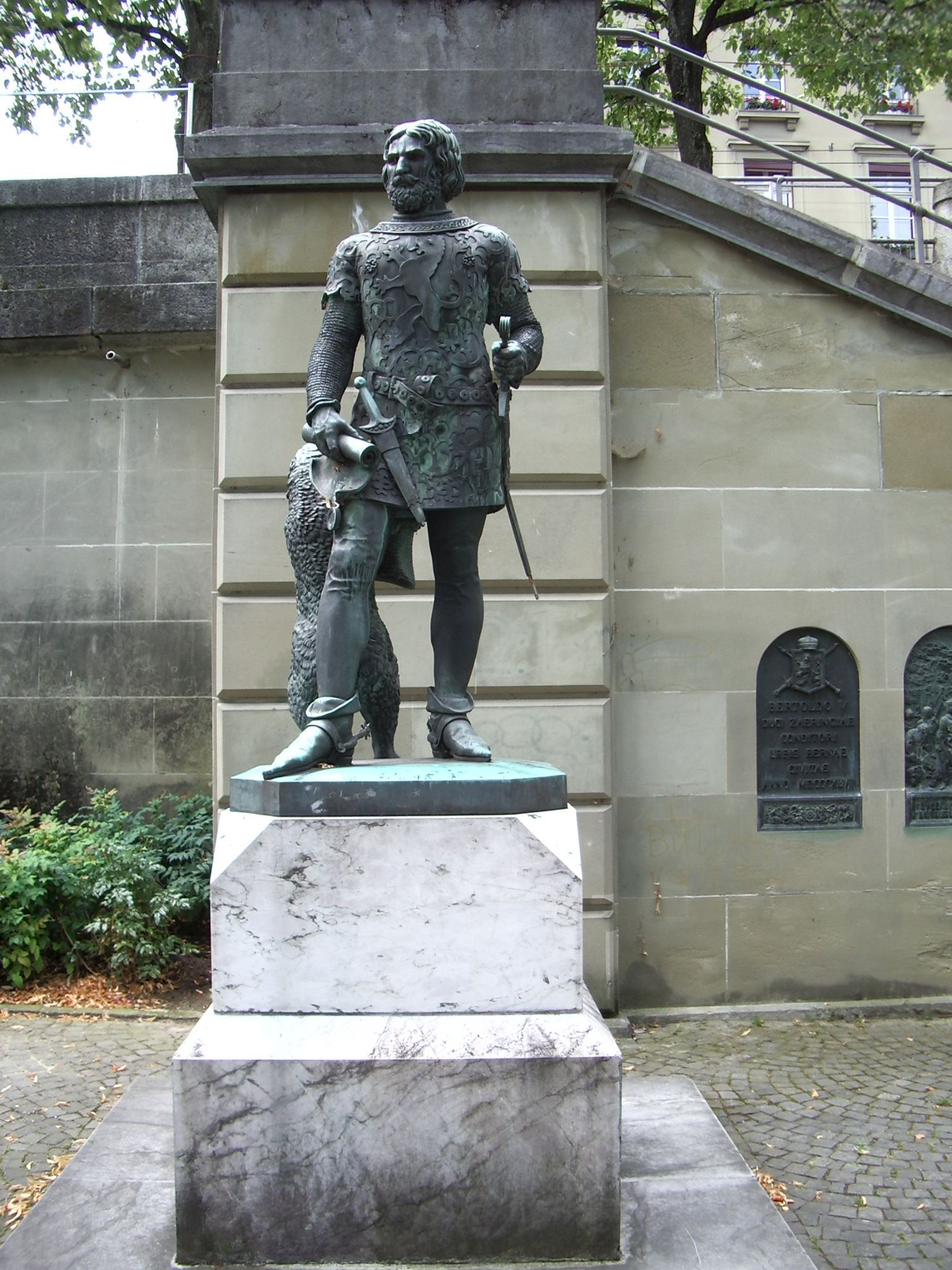
- Berchtoldstag
- Observed by: Liechtenstein, parts of Switzerland
- Date: 2 January
- Next time: 2 January 2027
- Frequency: annual

Berchtoldstag (also Bechtelistag, Bächtelistag, Berchtelistag, Bärzelistag, in Liechtenstein Bechtelstag, Bechtle) is an Alemannic holiday, known in Switzerland and Liechtenstein. It is near New Year's Day, during the Rauhnächte, in Switzerland nearly always on 2 January (in Frauenfeld on the third Monday in January), with the status of a public holiday in a number of cantons (AG, BE, FR, GL, JU, LU, NE, OW, SH, SO, TG, VD, ZG, ZH). Its observation is attested since the 14th century, although celebrations were limited after the Protestant Reformation.

Various theories exist concerning the holiday's name. Blessed Berchtold of Engelberg Abbey died circa 2 November 1197, and the abbey could have been important enough to translate his feast out of advent. According to others, it celebrates a hunting trip circa 1191 by Duke Berchtold V of Zähringen, who decided to name his new city after the first animal he killed on that trip, hence Bern, Switzerland. Another theory associates the name with the verb 'berchten', which means "to walk around, asking for food". The name may also relate to Perchta, mythological or folkloric female guardian of animals, and sometimes leader of the Wild Hunt, since Twelfth Night traditions even in the Spanish Pyrenees can feature visits from a transformed human/animal. The most likely explanation is offered by the Schweizerisches Idiotikon that considers it derived from Middle High German berhttac or berhteltac, which translated the Greek epiphanias. Indeed, Berchtoldstag especially occurs in Protestant regions where Epiphany has been abolished and replaced by a second day-off after New Year's Day.

In the German-speaking cantons of Zurich and Thurgau as well as some parts of Central Switzerland, families celebrate the holiday with meals at pubs or offered by traditional societies. The Argovian village of Hallwil holds a mask parade with entries symbolizing fertility, age, ugliness, wisdom, vice, etc. In the French-speaking Vaud, children celebrate Berchtoldstag with neighborhood parties which include folk dancing and singing.

Nuts are associated with this holiday. They are both eaten in a "nut feast" and used for games. Children build "hocks" of four nuts close together on the ground with a fifth nut balanced on top.

== See also ==
- Public holidays in Switzerland
- Fasnacht
