= Federal Day of Thanksgiving, Repentance and Prayer =

Public holiday in Switzerland

- Official name: German: Eidgenössischer Dank-, Buss- und Bettag, French: Jeûne fédéral, Italian: Digiuno federale, Romansh: Rogaziun federala
- Also called: German: Bettag
- Observed by: Switzerland, except in the canton of Geneva
- Date: Third Sunday in September
- 2025 date: September 21
- 2026 date: September 20
- 2027 date: September 19
- 2028 date: September 17
- Frequency: annual
- Related to: Lundi du Jeûne, Jeûne genevois

The Federal Day of Thanksgiving, Repentance and Prayer (German: Eidgenössischer Dank-, Buss- und Bettag, French: Jeûne fédéral, Italian: Digiuno federale) is a public holiday in Switzerland. It is an interfaith feast observed by Roman Catholic dioceses, the Old Catholic Church, the Jewish and Muslim congregations, Reformed church bodies as well as other Christian denominations.

It is celebrated on the third Sunday in September. The subsequent Monday (Lundi du Jeûne) is a public holiday in the Canton of Vaud. In the Canton of Neuchâtel it is an unofficial holiday; the cantonal administration and many businesses are closed.

In the Canton of Geneva another comparable fast, the Jeûne genevois, is celebrated.

== See also ==
- Germany's Buß- und Bettag
