= Republic Day =

National Festival of several countries commemorating their establishment as republics

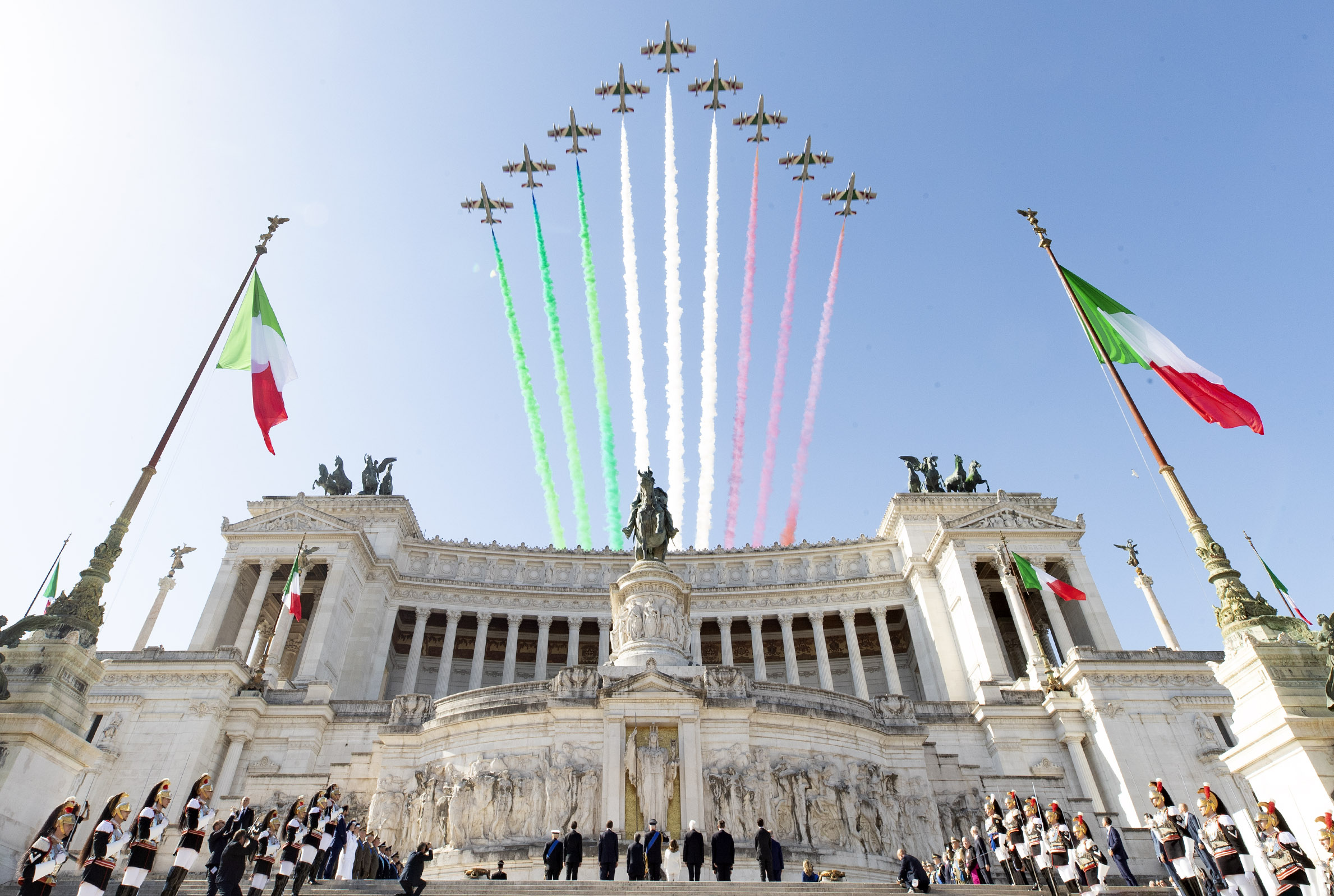
The Frecce Tricolori, with the smoke trail representing the national colours of Italy, above the Victor Emmanuel II Monument in Rome during the celebrations of the Festa della Repubblica in Italy, June 2, 2022

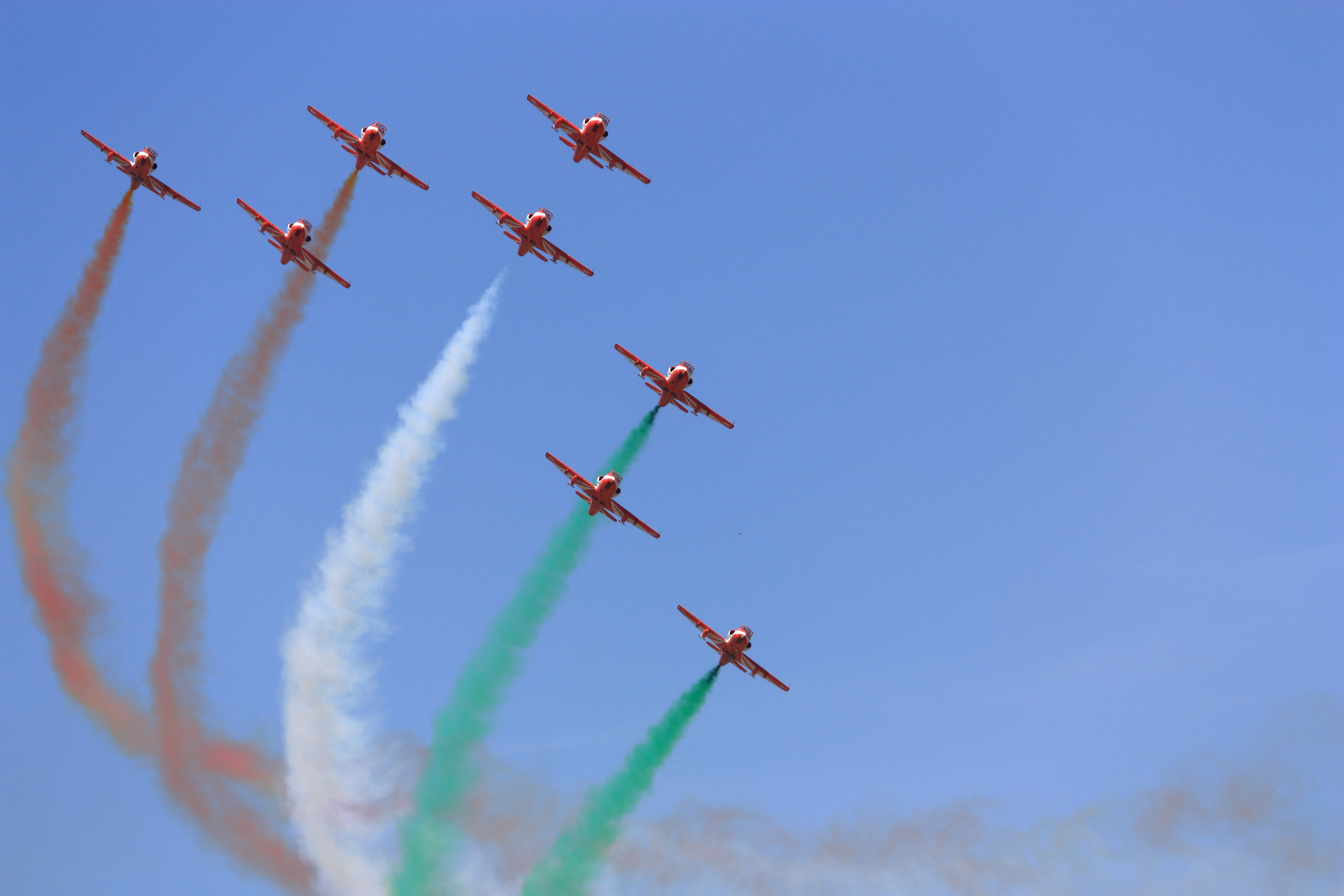
Surya Kiran Aerobatics Team displaying tricolor in India, February 11, 2011.

Republic Day is the name of a holiday in several countries to commemorate the day when they became republics.

== List ==
Legend
Ceased to be republic
Transition during or following World War I (1914–1923)
Transition during or following World War II (1939–1950)
Transition in pre or post world war era

Country	Date of transition	Remarks
Netherlands	26 July 1581	The Republic of the Seven United Netherlands declared its independence from King Philip II of Spain on 26 July 1581 with the Act of Abjuration, and became the Batavian Republic in 1795. The Kingdom of Holland was formed on 5 June 1806.
Switzerland	24 October 1648	Switzerland became independent from the Holy Roman Empire by the Treaty of Westphalia
England	19 May 1649	The Commonwealth of England, later known as the Protectorate, was established on 19 May 1649 following the execution of King Charles I. At its height, it ruled over all the British Isles. The monarchy was restored on 29 May 1660, and would merge with Scotland on 1 May 1707 and later Northern Ireland on 1 January 1801 to form the United Kingdom.
United States	4 July 1776	Went de facto independent from Great Britain with adoption of the United States Declaration of Independence
Paraguay	15 May 1811	Independence from Spain
Argentina	9 July 1816	Independence won from the Spanish Empire. Republican governments were established from 1811 onwards. Republican constitutions of 1819 and 1826 led to the adoption of the 1853 text
Chile	12 February 1818	Independence was declared by the Spanish Empire. Between 1810 and 1814 there were Republican governments although nominally remained loyal to the Spanish monarchy. In 1817 there was re-established the independentist government and established a republican system in different constitutional texts.
Venezuela	15 August 1819	Venezuelan constitution of 1819 adopted
Colombia	17 December 1819	Republic of Colombia declared during the Congress of Angostura
Panama	17 December 1819	Republic of Colombia declared during the Congress of Angostura
Ecuador	24 May 1822	Incorporated into Republic of Colombia, end of Royal Audiencia of Quito
Costa Rica	1 July 1823	Independence of United Provinces of Central America
El Salvador	1 July 1823	Independence of United Provinces of Central America
Guatemala	1 July 1823	Independence of United Provinces of Central America
Honduras	1 July 1823	Independence of United Provinces of Central America
Nicaragua	1 July 1823	Independence of United Provinces of Central America
Peru	9 December 1824	Treaty signed after Battle of Ayacucho
Bolivia	6 August 1825	Constitutional Congress declared Bolivia a republic
Uruguay	4 October 1828	Ratification of Treaty of Montevideo
Liberia	26 July 1847	Independent Republic of Liberia created
Haiti	15 January 1859	Abdication of Emperor Faustin
Dominican Republic	25 March 1865	Adoption of new constitution near end of Dominican Restoration War
Mexico	15 July 1867	Emperor Maxmilian executed; Federal Republic officially restored
France	4 September 1870	Emperor Napoleon III deposed and French Third Republic proclaimed as a result of the Franco-Prussian War
Algeria	4 September 1870	Republican government instituted when French mother country became a republic
Djibouti	4 September 1870	Republican government instituted when French mother country became a republic
Ivory Coast	4 September 1870	Republican government instituted when French mother country became a republic
Mauritania	4 September 1870	Republican government instituted when French mother country became a republic
Senegal	4 September 1870	Republican government instituted when French mother country became a republic
Brazil	15 November 1889	Emperor Pedro II deposed and Brazilian Republic proclaimed by Marshall Deodoro da Fonseca
Madagascar	28 February 1897	End of Merina Kingdom
Philippines	23 January 1899	First Philippine Republic. (Note: The First Philippine Republic was a nascent revolutionary government established on 23 January 1899, during the period following the end of the Spanish–American War. That war had concluded with the cession of the Philippines to the U.S. by Spain, and the Philippines was under U.S. military government at the time. Hostilities which erupted between the Philippine Revolutionary Army and U.S. forces on 4 February 1899 quickly developed into the Philippine–American War, which led to the dissolution of that nascent government.)
Cuba	11 April 1899	Official end of Spanish–American War
Portugal	5 October 1910	King Manuel II deposed and Portuguese First Republic proclaimed as a result of the 1910 revolution
Angola	5 October 1910	Republican government instituted when Portuguese mother country became a republic
Cape Verde	5 October 1910	Republican government instituted when Portuguese mother country became a republic
East Timor	5 October 1910	Republican government instituted when Portuguese mother country became a republic
Guinea-Bissau	5 October 1910	Republican government instituted when Portuguese mother country became a republic
Mozambique	5 October 1910	Republican government instituted when Portuguese mother country became a republic
São Tomé and Príncipe	5 October 1910	Republican government instituted when Portuguese mother country became a republic
China	10 October 1911	Republic of China (ROC) proclaimed as a result of the Xinhai Revolution. The ROC was initially in control of mainland China but later relocated to Taiwan. It is now commonly known as "Taiwan". The People's Republic of China was proclaimed on 1 October 1949 and is now in control of mainland China. It is commonly known as "China".
Comoros	25 July 1912	End of the last remaining indigenous sultanate of Comoros, Ndzuwani, following the abdication of Sultan Said Ali
Armenia	14 September 1917	Emperor Nicholas II of Russia abdicated as a result of the February Revolution and Russia was proclaimed a republic
Azerbaijan	14 September 1917	Emperor Nicholas II of Russia abdicated as a result of the February Revolution and Russia was proclaimed a republic
Belarus	14 September 1917	Emperor Nicholas II of Russia abdicated as a result of the February Revolution and Russia was proclaimed a republic
Estonia	14 September 1917	Emperor Nicholas II of Russia abdicated as a result of the February Revolution and Russia was proclaimed a republic
Georgia	14 September 1917	Emperor Nicholas II of Russia abdicated as a result of the February Revolution and Russia was proclaimed a republic
Kazakhstan	14 September 1917	Emperor Nicholas II of Russia abdicated as a result of the February Revolution and Russia was proclaimed a republic
Kyrgyzstan	14 September 1917	Emperor Nicholas II of Russia abdicated as a result of the February Revolution and Russia was proclaimed a republic
Latvia	14 September 1917	Emperor Nicholas II of Russia abdicated as a result of the February Revolution and Russia was proclaimed a republic
Russia	14 September 1917	Emperor Nicholas II of Russia abdicated as a result of the February Revolution and Russia was proclaimed a republic
Ukraine	14 September 1917	Emperor Nicholas II of Russia abdicated as a result of the February Revolution and Russia was proclaimed a republic
Georgia	26 May 1918	The Democratic Republic of Georgia declared its independence.
Azerbaijan	28 May 1918	The Azerbaijan Democratic Republic declared its independence.
Armenia	28 May 1918	The First Republic of Armenia declared its independence.
Czech Republic	18 October 1918	Czechoslovak Republic proclaimed
Slovakia	18 October 1918	Czechoslovak Republic proclaimed
Lithuania	2 November 1918	King Mindaugas II deposed and Republic of Lithuania proclaimed
Germany	9 November 1918	Emperor William II abdicated as a result of the German Revolution
Austria	12 November 1918	Republic of German Austria proclaimed following the dethronement of Emperor Charles
Poland	14 November 1918	Power transferred from the Regency Council to Chief of State Józef Piłsudski
Finland	17 July 1919	Constitution Act or Instrument of Government: Finland became a republic
Turkmenistan	26 April 1920	Khan Sayid Abdullah deposed and Khorezm People's Soviet Republic proclaimed
Lebanon	23 July 1920	French Mandate of Syria established after the Battle of Maysalun
Syria	23 July 1920	French Mandate of Syria established after the Battle of Maysalun
Tajikistan	8 October 1920	Emir Mohammed Alim Khan deposed and Bukharan People's Republic proclaimed
Uzbekistan	8 October 1920	Emir Mohammed Alim Khan deposed and Bukharan People's Republic proclaimed
Togo	20 July 1922	Formal beginning of French Togoland League of Nations Mandate
Turkey	29 October 1923	Republic of Turkey was proclaimed after the Turkish War of Independence, succeeding the Ottoman Empire
Mongolia	26 November 1924	Mongolian People's Republic proclaimed. Now the date is celebrated as 'Republic Day' Public holidays in Mongolia
Spain	14 April 1931	The Second Spanish Republic came to power on 14 April 1931 following the economic crisis caused by the 1929 Wall Street Crash. The Republic lost power after the Spanish Civil War. Francisco Franco then led Spain until his death on 20 November 1975 when democracy, along with the monarchy, was restored.
Moldova	2 August 1940	Moldavian Soviet Socialist Republic proclaimed following the annexation of Romanian Moldavia by the Soviet Union
Iceland	17 June 1944	Republic of Iceland established after a referendum
North Korea	15 August 1945	Korea liberated from Japan and the People's Republic of Korea established, divided into North Korea and South Korea a month later.
South Korea	15 August 1945	Korea liberated from Japan and the People's Republic of Korea established, divided into North Korea and South Korea a month later.
Indonesia	17 August 1945	Republic of Indonesia's proclamation of independence triggering the Indonesian National Revolution
Vietnam	25 August 1945	Emperor Bảo Đại abdicated and Democratic Republic of Vietnam was proclaimed
Taiwan	25 October 1945	Taiwan and Penghu Islands transferred to the Republic of China. Since 1949, the ROC only controls Taiwan and the surrounding islands.
Bosnia and Herzegovina	29 November 1945	Socialist Federal Republic of Yugoslavia proclaimed while King Peter II was in exile
Croatia	29 November 1945	Socialist Federal Republic of Yugoslavia proclaimed while King Peter II was in exile
Kosovo	29 November 1945	Socialist Federal Republic of Yugoslavia proclaimed while King Peter II was in exile
Montenegro	29 November 1945	Socialist Federal Republic of Yugoslavia proclaimed while King Peter II was in exile
North Macedonia	29 November 1945	Socialist Federal Republic of Yugoslavia proclaimed while King Peter II was in exile
Serbia	29 November 1945	Socialist Federal Republic of Yugoslavia proclaimed while King Peter II was in exile
Slovenia	29 November 1945	Socialist Federal Republic of Yugoslavia proclaimed while King Peter II was in exile
Albania	1 January 1946	People's Republic of Albania proclaimed while King Zog was in exile
Hungary	1 February 1946	The Second Hungarian Republic proclaimed
Italy	2 June 1946	King Umberto II renounced the throne and the Italian Republic was established after a referendum
Bulgaria	15 September 1946	Tsar Simeon II deposed and People's Republic of Bulgaria proclaimed after a referendum
Marshall Islands	18 July 1947	end of South Pacific Mandate and beginning of Trust Territory of the Pacific Islands
Micronesia	18 July 1947	end of South Pacific Mandate and beginning of Trust Territory of the Pacific Islands
Palau	18 July 1947	end of South Pacific Mandate and beginning of Trust Territory of the Pacific Islands
Romania	30 December 1947	King Michael abdicated and the People's Republic of Romania was proclaimed
Myanmar	4 January 1948	Burmese independence declared
Israel	14 May 1948	State of Israel proclaimed
Ireland	18 April 1949	Republic of Ireland Act came into force
India	26 January 1950	Constitution of India came into effect
Egypt	18 June 1953	Republic proclaimed after revolution in 1952
South Sudan	1 January 1956	Independence of Republic of Sudan
Sudan	1 January 1956	Independence of Republic of Sudan
Pakistan	23 March 1956	Constitution of Pakistan came into effect and Governor-General Iskander Mirza became president. Three coups in 1958 Pakistani coup d'état, 1977 and in 1999 respectively before restoration of the civil electorate in 2008.
Tunisia	25 July 1957	King Muhammad VIII al-Amin deposed
Iraq	14 July 1958	Faisal II deposed/killed in 14 July Revolution
Somalia	26 June 1960	Independence of State of Somaliland, which was united with the Trust Territory of Somalia on 1 July to form the Somali Republic
Democratic Republic of the Congo	30 June 1960	Gained independence as a republic
Ghana	1 July 1960	Constitutional change after referendum on 27 April
Cyprus	16 August 1960	The Constitution of the Republic of Cyprus adopted
South Africa	31 May 1961	Republican constitution adopted
Cameroon	1 October 1961	End of British Trusteeship in Southern Cameroons, union with rest of Cameroon
Rwanda	1 July 1962	Independence as a republic following monarchy referendum in 1961
Yemen	27 September 1962	King Muhammad al-Badr deposed and Yemen Arab Republic (North Yemen) proclaimed
Nigeria	1 October 1963	Constitutional amendment
Uganda	9 October 1963	Constitutional amendment
Zambia	24 October 1964	Gained independence as a republic
Kenya	12 December 1964	Republican constitution adopted
Singapore	9 August 1965	Ousted from the Federation of Malaysia
Malawi	6 July 1966	Republican constitution adopted
Botswana	30 September 1966	Gained independence as a republic
Burundi	28 November 1966	Republic declared after army coup d'état
Nauru	31 January 1968	Gained independence as a republic
Equatorial Guinea	12 October 1968	Gained independence as a republic
Maldives	11 November 1968	Sultan Muhammad Fareed Didi deposed and Maldivian Second Republic established after a referendum
Libya	1 September 1969	King Idris I deposed by Muammar Gaddafi's coup d'état
Guyana	23 February 1970	Co-operative Republic of Guyana proclaimed
Cambodia	18 March 1970	The Khmer Republic (later known as Democratic Kampuchea, then the People's Republic of Kampuchea, and finally the State of Cambodia) was declared in 1970 when Prince Norodom Sihanouk was deposed. The monarchy was restored in 1993.
The Gambia	24 April 1970	Republic proclaimed following a constitutional referendum
Sierra Leone	19 April 1971	Republican constitution adopted
Sri Lanka	22 May 1972	Sri Lankan constitution adopted
Bangladesh	16 December 1972	The Constitution came into effect a year after the formation of the state in 1972. Three coups followed in 1975 and 1982.
Afghanistan	17 July 1973	King Mohammed Zahir Shah abdicated after Mohammed Daoud Khan's coup d'état
Greece	8 December 1974	Final abolition of monarchy; referendum
Malta	13 December 1974	Republic of Malta proclaimed
Eritrea	21 March 1975	Monarchy of Ethiopian Empire finally abolished
Ethiopia	21 March 1975	Monarchy of Ethiopian Empire finally abolished
Suriname	25 November 1975	Gained independence as a republic
Laos	2 December 1975	King Savang Vatthana abdicated as a result of a communist revolution
Seychelles	29 June 1976	Gained independence as a republic
Trinidad and Tobago	1 August 1976	Republican constitution adopted
Dominica	3 November 1978	Gained independence as a republic
Iran	11 February 1979	Shah Mohammad Reza Pahlavi deposed and the Islamic Republic of Iran (a theocratic republic) was proclaimed as a result of the Iranian Revolution
Kiribati	12 July 1979	Gained independence as a republic
Central African Republic	21 September 1979	Emperor Bokassa I deposed in a coup d'état
Zimbabwe	17 April 1980	Full independence of Zimbabwe
Vanuatu	30 July 1980	Gained independence as a republic
Fiji	6 October 1987	Fiji Republic proclaimed as a result of the coup d'état of Sitiveni Rabuka
Mauritius	12 March 1992	Republic of Mauritius proclaimed as a result of constitutional changes
Samoa	11 May 2007	Upon the death of Malietoa Tanumafili II, Samoa changed to a parliamentary republic.
Nepal	28 May 2008	Abolition of monarchy
Barbados	30 November 2021	Republic of Barbados declared effective 30 November 2021.

== January ==
=== 1 January in Slovak Republic ===
The day of creation of Slovak republic. A national holiday since 1993. Officially called The day of establishment of Slovak republic.

=== 9 January in Republika Srpska (Bosnia and Herzegovina) ===
After Yugoslavia fell apart, Serbs in Bosnia and Herzegovina wanted to stay with Serbia and Montenegro. Croats and Bosniaks, on the other hand, wanted to create an independent state of Bosnia and Herzegovina. On 9 January 1992, Bosnian Serb authorities declared the creation of the Serbian Republic of Bosnia and Herzegovina, now called Republika Srpska ("Serb Republic", not to be confused with the Republic of Serbia) as a state within the country of Bosnia of Herzegovina. Republika Srpska now celebrates Republic Day on the anniversary of the state's creation.

=== 26 January in India ===
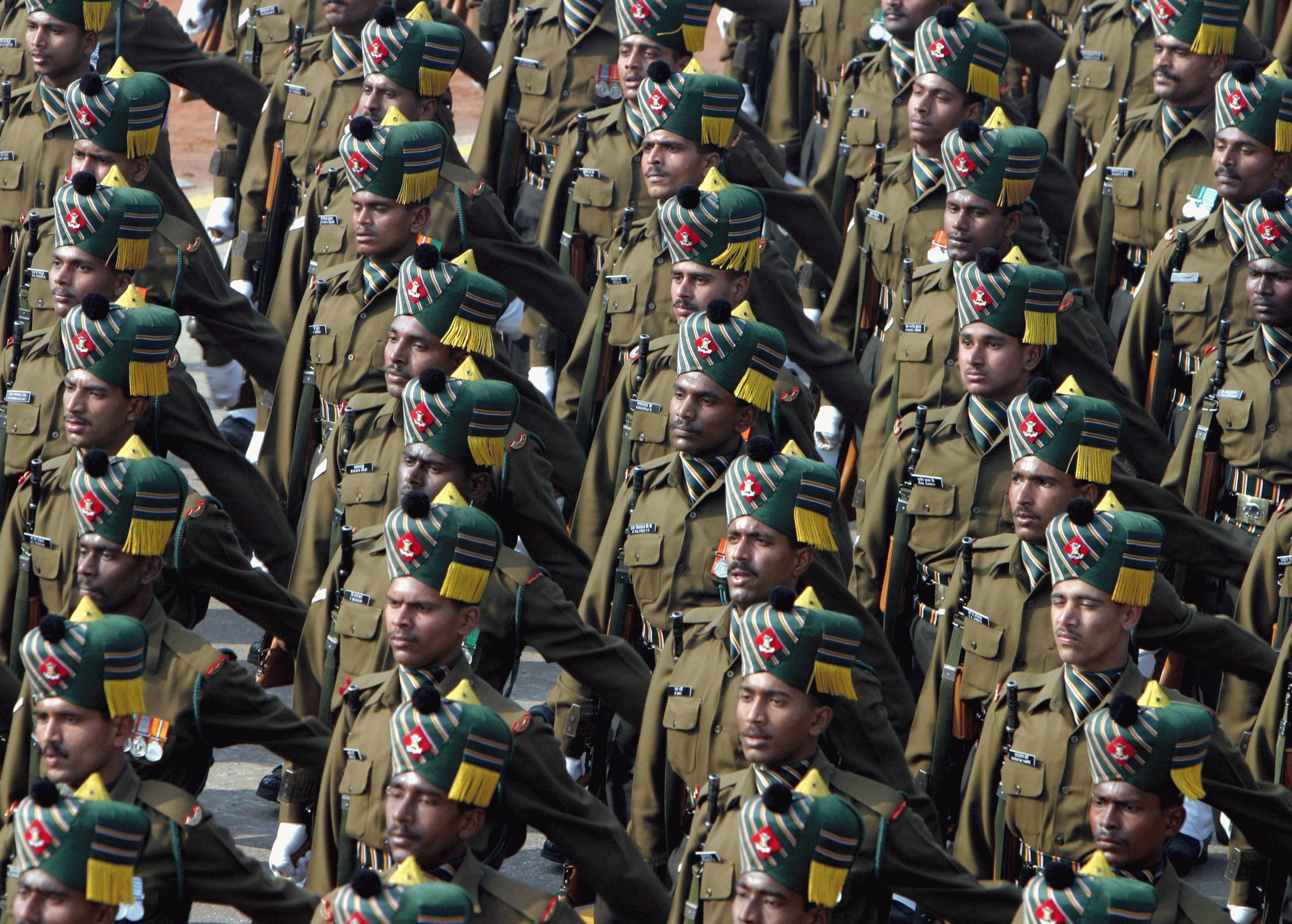
Soldiers of the Madras Regiment during the annual Republic Day Parade in 2004.

The Constitution of India came into force, and India declared itself a Republic on 26 January 1950, a day thereafter celebrated annually as Republic Day in India. The Constitution had been drafted by the Constituent Assembly which was set up when India gained its independence from the British in 1947. This was a deliberate act: The 26 January was initially India's "Independence Day", one of Mahatma Gandhi's many symbolic acts during India's struggle for freedom against British colonial rule, and the adoption of the Constitution on this date was felt able to strengthen its initial meaning, one calling for Indians of all ages to declare their freedom from the British Raj by Mahatama Gandhi. It is one of three national holidays in India, the other two being the nation's Independence Day on 15 August (since 1947) and the birthday of Mohandas Karamchand Gandhi on 2 October.

To mark this occasion, a grand parade is held near Kartavya Path, formerly Rajpath in New Delhi, beginning from Raisina Hill near the Rashtrapati Bhavan (Presidential Palace), along the Kartavya path, past India Gate and on to the historic Red Fort in the old quarter of the city. Different infantry, cavalry and mechanized regiments of the Indian Army, the Indian Marines and the Indian Air Force march in formation, decked in all their finery and official decorations. The President of India, who is also the Commander in Chief of the Indian Armed Forces, takes the salute. The Chief Guest of the parade is the Head of State or Head of Government of another nation. The parade also includes many traditional dance troupes, to symbolize the cultural heritage of India. It traditionally ends with a colourful flypast by Indian Air Force jets in a tiranga formation. Similar parades are held in the capitals of all the states of India, where the Governors of the respective states take the salute. The official conclusion of Republic Day festivities is much later on 30 January, four days after the Republic Day.

== February ==
=== 1 February in Hungary ===
On 1 February 1946, Hungary commemorates the proclamation of the Republic of Hungary. Since 2004, this day is a national commemoration day, without being a public or national Holiday.

== March ==
=== 1 March in Switzerland ===
Republic Day is a public holiday in the Canton of Neuchâtel, celebrated annually on March 1st. On March 1, 1848, inspired by the Spring of Nations across Europe, a group of republican rebels led by Fritz Courvoisier marched from the mountains of La Chaux-de-Fonds and Le Locle toward the city of Neuchâtel, overthrowing the Prussian monarchy in the region and established Neuchâtel as a republic within the Swiss Confederation.

=== 23 March in Pakistan ===
In Pakistan, this day marks the passing of the Lahore Resolution. Republic Day of Pakistan was first observed in 1956 when Pakistan officially became a Republic and shunned the former status of Dominion. The main events of this day include a full military parade and the awarding of honours at the Presidency (Presidential Palace) by the president. Every year, on 23 March, the Pakistani people commemorate their National Day in remembrance of "The Pakistan Resolution" passed on 23 March 1956, in the historic city of Lahore which is also the day the country was declared a republic.

== May ==
=== 28 May in Azerbaijan, Armenia and Nepal ===
On 28 May 1918, Azerbaijan and Armenia declared independence from the Transcaucasian Democratic Federative Republic, thus forming the Azerbaijan Democratic Republic and the Republic of Armenia. Nepal also became a republic on the same day, replacing the old monarchist regime, the Kingdom of Nepal. These were the first sovereign republics in the history of both countries, and Nepal was the first democratic parliamentary republic after the dissolution of the Soviet Union.

A decade-long People's Revolution by the Communist Party of Nepal (Maoist), along with several weeks of mass protests by all major political parties of Nepal in 2006, culminated in a peace accord, and the ensuing elections for the constituent assembly voted overwhelmingly in favor of the abdication of the last Nepali monarch Gyanendra Shah and the establishment of a federal democratic republic on 28 May 2008.

=== 31 May in South Africa (1961–1994) ===
Between 1961 and 1994, 31 May was celebrated in South Africa as Republic Day. This practice was discontinued in 1995 following the attainment of majority rule and the reorganisation of public holidays as a consequence. On the last Republic Day, in 1994, South Africa rejoined the Commonwealth of Nations.

== June ==
=== 2 June in Italy ===
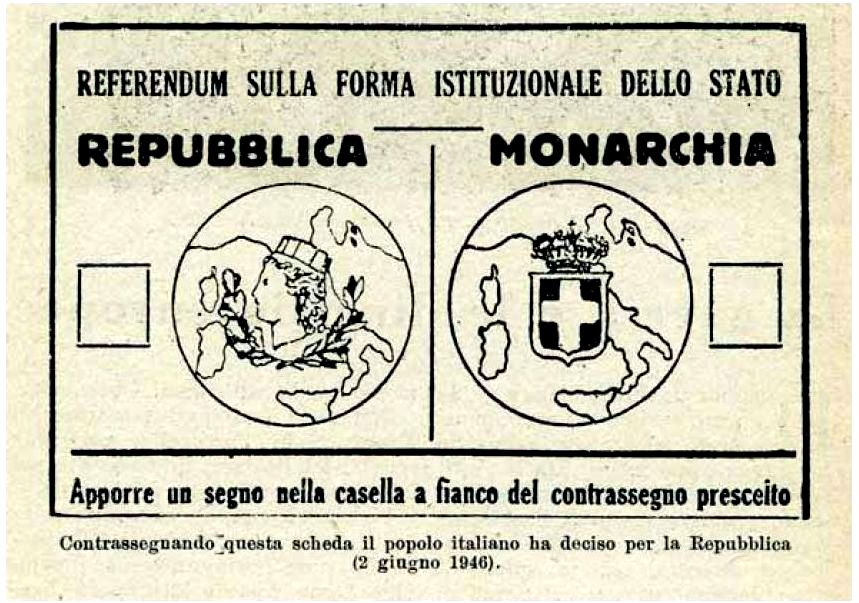
Electoral ballot of the 1946 Italian institutional referendum

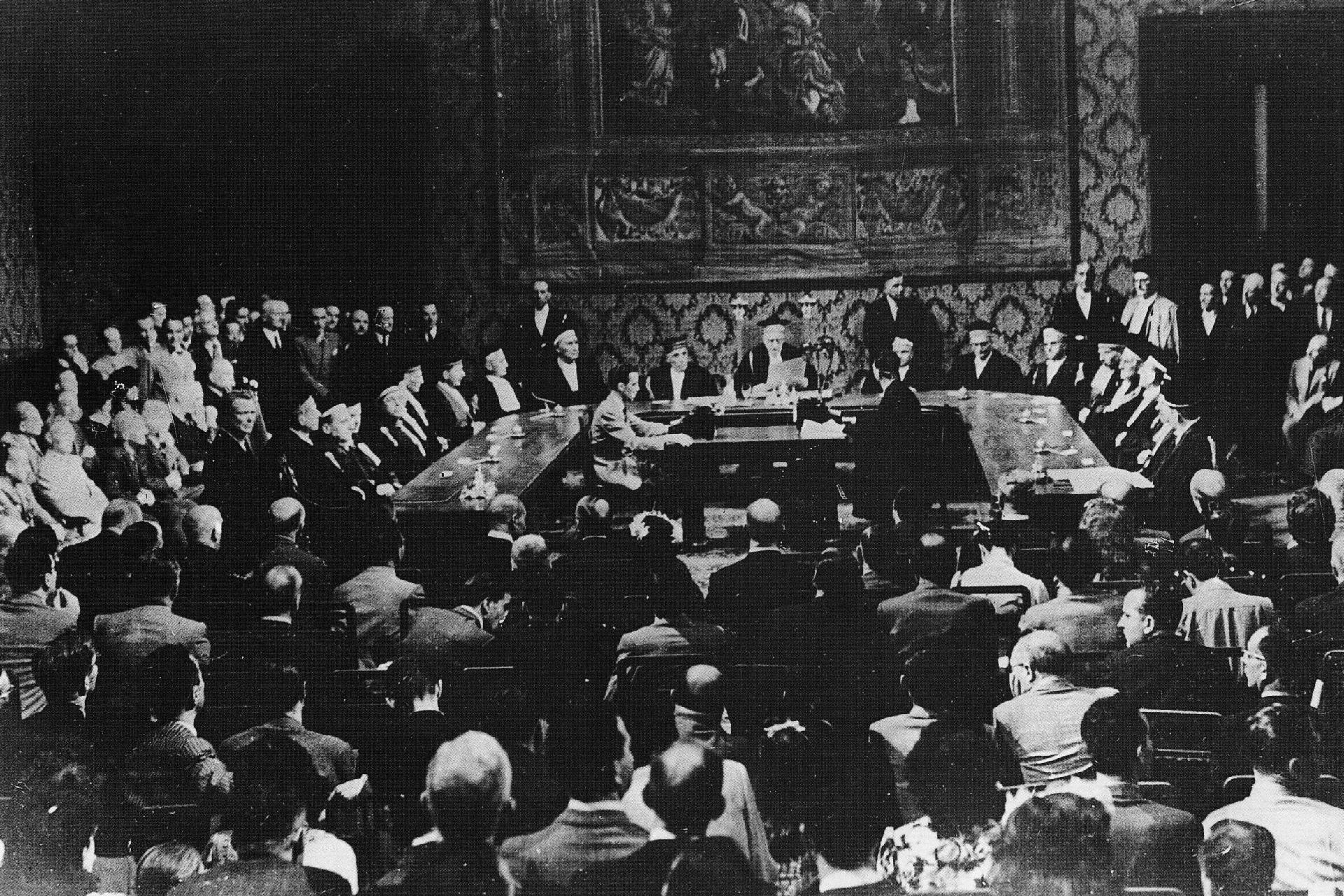
Session of the Italian Supreme Court of Cassation on 10 June 1946, which approved the results of the Italian institutional referendum

An institutional referendum (Italian: referendum istituzionale, or referendum sulla forma istituzionale dello Stato) was held by universal suffrage in the Kingdom of Italy on 2 June 1946, a key event of contemporary Italian history. Until 1946, Italy was a kingdom ruled by the House of Savoy, reigning since the unification of Italy in 1861 and previously rulers of the Kingdom of Sardinia. In 1922, the rise of Benito Mussolini and the creation of the Fascist regime in Italy, which eventually resulted in engaging the country in World War II alongside Nazi Germany, considerably weakened the role of the royal house.

Following the Italian Civil War and the Liberation of Italy from Axis troops in 1945, a popular referendum on the institutional form of the state was called the next year and resulted in voters choosing the replacement of the monarchy with a republic. The 1946 Italian general election to elect the Constituent Assembly of Italy was held on the same day. As with the simultaneous Constituent Assembly elections, the referendum was not held in the Julian March, in the province of Zara or the province of Bolzano, which were still under occupation by Allied forces pending a final settlement of the status of the territories.

The results were proclaimed by the Supreme Court of Cassation on 10 June 1946: 12,717,923 citizens in favor of the republic and 10,719,284 citizens in favor of the monarchy. The event is commemorated annually by the Festa della Repubblica. The former King Umberto II voluntarily left the country on 13 June 1946, headed for Cascais, in southern Portugal, without even waiting for the results to be defined and the ruling on the appeals presented by the monarchist party, which were rejected by the Supreme Court of Cassation on 18 June 1946. With the entry into force of the new Constitution of the Italian Republic, on 1 January 1948, Enrico De Nicola became the first to assume the functions of president of Italy. It was the first time that the whole Italian Peninsula (excluding Vatican City) was under a form of republican governance since the end of the ancient Roman Republic.

== July ==
=== 1 July in Ghana ===
Ghana Republic Day.

=== 4 July in the Philippines ===
4 July 1946 is the Philippines' Republic Day.

=== 25 July in Tunisia ===
25 July is the day the monarchy was abolished by the National Assembly and a republic was proclaimed in its place. Habib Bourguiba was chosen to be the first President.

== October ==
=== 5 October in Portugal ===
5 October in Portugal is known as Implantação da República. It celebrates the proclamation of the Portuguese First Republic in 1910.

=== 10 October in Republic of China ===
10 October in Taiwan is a national holiday commemorating the establishment of the Republic of China in 1911, the symbolic start of the 1911 Revolution with the Wuchang Uprising. It is also known as the Double Ten Day.

=== 25 October in Kazakhstan ===
In the waning days of Soviet rule, individual republics of the Soviet Union sought greater autonomy. The Soviet Union agreed in early 1990 to give up its monopoly of political power. Following the lead of Lithuanian SSR, Russian SFSR and others, Kazakh SSR declared its sovereignty on 25 October 1990, and Kazakhstan subsequently became independent on 16 December 1991 as the Soviet Union collapsed. 25 October, the anniversary of the adoption of the "Declaration on State Sovereignty of Kazakh SSR" by the Kazakh legislature in 1990, is now commemorated as Republic Day (Kazakh: Республика күні, romanized: Respwblïka küni), a public holiday in Kazakhstan.

=== 29 October in Turkey ===
On 29 October 1923, the Turkish constitution was amended and Turkey became a republic. This formally declared the dissolution of the Ottoman Empire. Republic Day (Turkish: Cumhuriyet Bayramı) is celebrated throughout Turkey and Northern Cyprus every year. Commemorative events usually begin in the afternoon on the previous day. In observance of the holiday, government offices and schools close for a day. Also, there are fireworks shows in all cities of Turkey. That day everyone commemorates Mustafa Kemal Atatürk.

== November ==
=== 11 November in the Maldives ===
On 11 November 1968, Maldives, which had a monarchist government at the time, had its old government (i.e. the aforementioned monarchist government) abolished on that date and replaced by a republic.

=== 15 November in Brazil and Northern Cyprus ===
On 15 November 1889, in the city of Rio de Janeiro, which was the Brazilian capital at that time, a military coup led by Field Marshal Deodoro da Fonseca overthrew Emperor Pedro II and declared Brazil a republic.

In Northern Cyprus, this day commemorates the declaration of the state’s independence from the Republic of Cyprus in 1983.

=== 30 November in Barbados ===
This day is celebrated as both Independence Day and Republic Day, as on 30 November 2021, Barbados was declared as a Republic within the Commonwealth. Dame Sandra Mason, the last Governor-General of Barbados was installed as the first President of Barbados.

== December ==
=== 12 December in Kenya ===
On 12 December 1963, Kenya gained independence from the United Kingdom. Exactly one year later, on 12 December 1964, it became a republic within the Commonwealth of Nations. The Swahili word for republic is jamhuri, and 12 December is celebrated annually as Jamhuri Day, Kenya's national republic holiday.

=== 13 December in Malta ===
On 13 December 1974, the constitution of Malta was substantially revised, transforming the former British colony from a Commonwealth Realm into a republic within the Commonwealth. The British Monarch ceased to be recognised as Reġina ta' Malta (Queen of Malta) and the new Head of State was President Sir Anthony Mamo. This occasion is marked every year as Republic Day (Maltese: Jum ir-Repubblika) in Malta. The monument of Republic Day is at Marsa.

=== 18 December in Niger ===
18 December 1958 is commemorated in the Republic of Niger as Republic Day, the national holiday. Although not the date of formal, complete independence from France, 18 December marks the founding of the Republic and creation of the Presidency of the Republic of Niger, following the constitutional changes of the French Fifth Republic, and the elections of 4 December 1958 held across The French Colonial possessions. Nigeriens consider this date to be the founding of their nation. Between 18 December 1958 and 5 August 1964, Niger remained a semi-autonomous Republic within the French Community.

The 16th is celebrated in Niger with official festivals and appearances of political leaders, as well as public parties and festivities. The 50th-anniversary celebrations were held in 2006, centered not in the capital, but in the regional center of Tillabéry, and surrounded by sports, musical and arts competitions, the opening of new buildings, a National Youth Festival, and other public festivities.

== Republic Day in other countries ==
- Guyana: 23 February (1970, also known as Mashramani)
- Iceland: 17 June (1944)
- Iran: 1 April (Islamic Republic Day)
- Lithuania: 15 May (1920, known as Constituent Assembly Day)
- North Korea: 9 September (1948)
- Republic of the Congo: 28 November (1958)
- Sierra Leone: 27 April (1961)
- Sri Lanka: 22 May (1972)
- Trinidad and Tobago: 24 September (1976)

== See also ==
- National Day
- Public holiday
