= Jeûne genevois =

Public holiday in Switzerland

Jeûne genevois (Geneva fast)
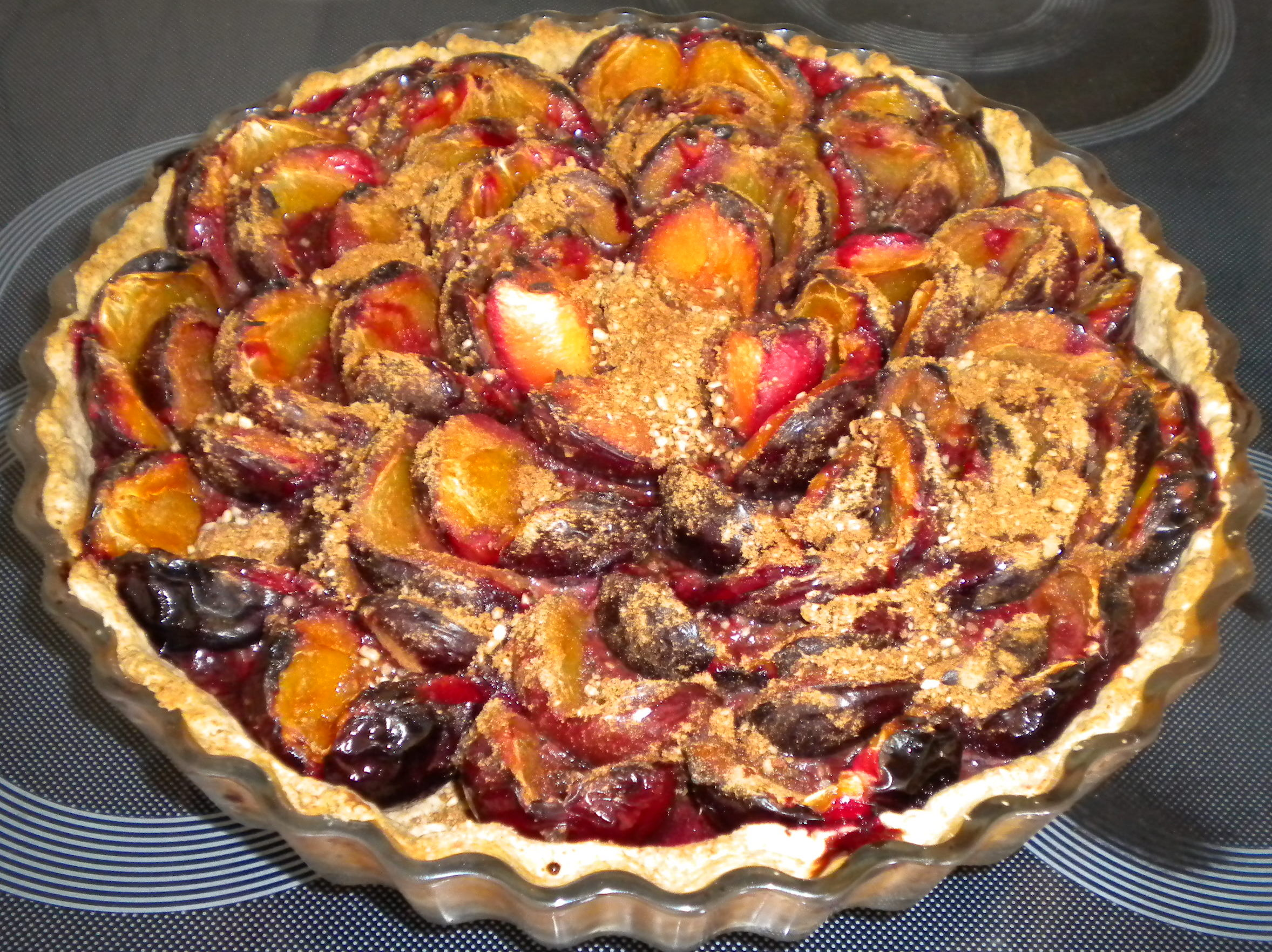
- Plum tart, a traditional food associated with the Jeûne genevois
- Observed by: Canton of Geneva, Switzerland
- Date: Thursday following the first Sunday of September
- 2025 date: 11 September
- 2026 date: 10 September
- 2027 date: 9 September
- 2028 date: 7 September
- Frequency: annual

Jeûne genevois (meaning Geneva fast) is a public holiday in the canton of Geneva, Switzerland which occurs on the Thursday following the first Sunday of September. It dates back to the 16th century.

== Background ==
The Swiss Federal Diets of 1480 and 1483 talked about national days of fasting as penitence and thanksgiving, but in the end, left these decisions to the cantons. With no federal law, fast days became pilgrimages, processions, litanies and fasts.

In 1522 Huldrych Zwingli, who helped stir Protestant Reformation in Switzerland, said fasting laws were only human notions which had nothing to do with the Holy Writ. Nonetheless, the plagues of Basel (1541) and Bern (1565 and 1577) were followed by days of penitence and fasting, asking God for clemency and mercy.

=== Began before St. Bartholomew's Day massacre ===
Geneva was a cradle of Protestantism and the Reformation. There was a Geneva-wide fast in the beginning of October 1567 as a sign of friendship with Protestants undergoing persecution in Lyon, France, and this was most likely the first Jeûne genevois (Genevan fast). Five years later, news of the St. Bartholomew's Day massacre and the slaughter of several thousand Huguenots beginning on 24 August 1572 triggered a fast throughout Geneva on the following 3 September, which could be why the date of later yearly fasts was shifted forward by almost a month.

By 1640, through sway of the reformed cantons, the fast had become yearly and was carried on even after the Genevan revolution of 1792. Jeûne genevois later became a patriotic holiday, symbolizing both Geneva's proud identity and its Protestantism. By the beginning of the Helvetic Republic folklore had thoroughly linked Jeûne genevois with the widely remembered St. Bartholomew's Day massacre and fasting in Geneva as the slaughter of whole Protestant families carried on throughout France.

== In Geneva ==
In 1831 the Federal Diet decreed a Jeûne Fédéral (federal fast) for all cantons, fixing the date at 8 September. This was later made the third Sunday in September but for Geneva, which fixed the day of its own Jeûne genevois.

In 1869 Geneva decreed that the holiday was no longer official, but Jeûne genevois was celebrated unofficially until 1965, slowly losing its religious significance. On 1 August 1966 it was again declared a public holiday and the date fixed as the Thursday following the first Sunday of September.

The religious fasting of Jeûne genevois is not widely followed. Banks and post offices along with many shops, restaurants and bars close for the day. However, unlike Thanksgiving in the U.S., which also falls on a Thursday, a four-day weekend is not usually taken and most businesses are open on Friday.

=== Plum tart ===
Plum tart(tarte aux pruneaux) is often served as dessert in Geneva homes on Jeûne genevois. Any knowledge as to how this tradition began seems to have been lost, although it may have come about as a means to allow women and housekeepers a way to spend the day in prayer, having cooked plum tarts the day before (area plums being in season). The plum tarts would thus be the only food eaten in many Geneva households on this particular day.
