= Kolly =

Kolly may refer to:

- Gabriel Kolly (1905 - 1974) was a Swiss politician
- Gilbert Kolly (born 1951), Swiss judge
- Herbert Kolly (born 1969), Swiss freestyle skier
- Nicolas Kolly (born 1986), Swiss politician
- Rachel Kolly d'Alba (born 1981), Swiss violinist
- Sandra Kolly (born 1974), Swiss sport shooter
- Urs Kolly (born 1968), Swiss athlete

== See also ==
- Colly (disambiguation)
- Koly
