= Pascal Corminboeuf =

Swiss politician (1944–2026)

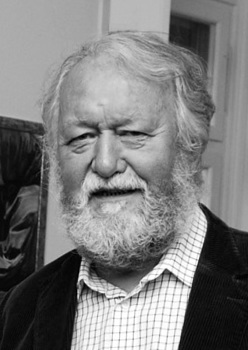
- Corminboeuf in 2013

Member of the Council of State of the Canton of Fribourg
- In office 8 December 1996 – 31 December 2011

Personal details
- Born: 8 February 1944 Domdidier, Switzerland
- Died: 10 June 2026 (aged 82)
- Party: Independent
- Education: University of Fribourg
- Occupation: Farmer

Pascal Corminboeuf (8 February 1944 – 10 June 2026) was a Swiss politician who was an independent.

Corminboeuf served in the Council of State of the Canton of Fribourg from 1996 to 2011.

Corminboeuf died on 10 June 2026, at the age of 82.
