= Zermatten =

Zermatten is a surname. Notable people with the surname include:

- Christian Zermatten (born 1966), Swiss football manager
- Cristian Zermatten (born 1974), Argentine footballer
- Jean Zermatten (born 1948), Swiss activist
- Maurice Zermatten (1910–2001), Swiss writer
- Walter Zermatten (born 1971), Argentine footballer
