= Collège Saint-Michel =

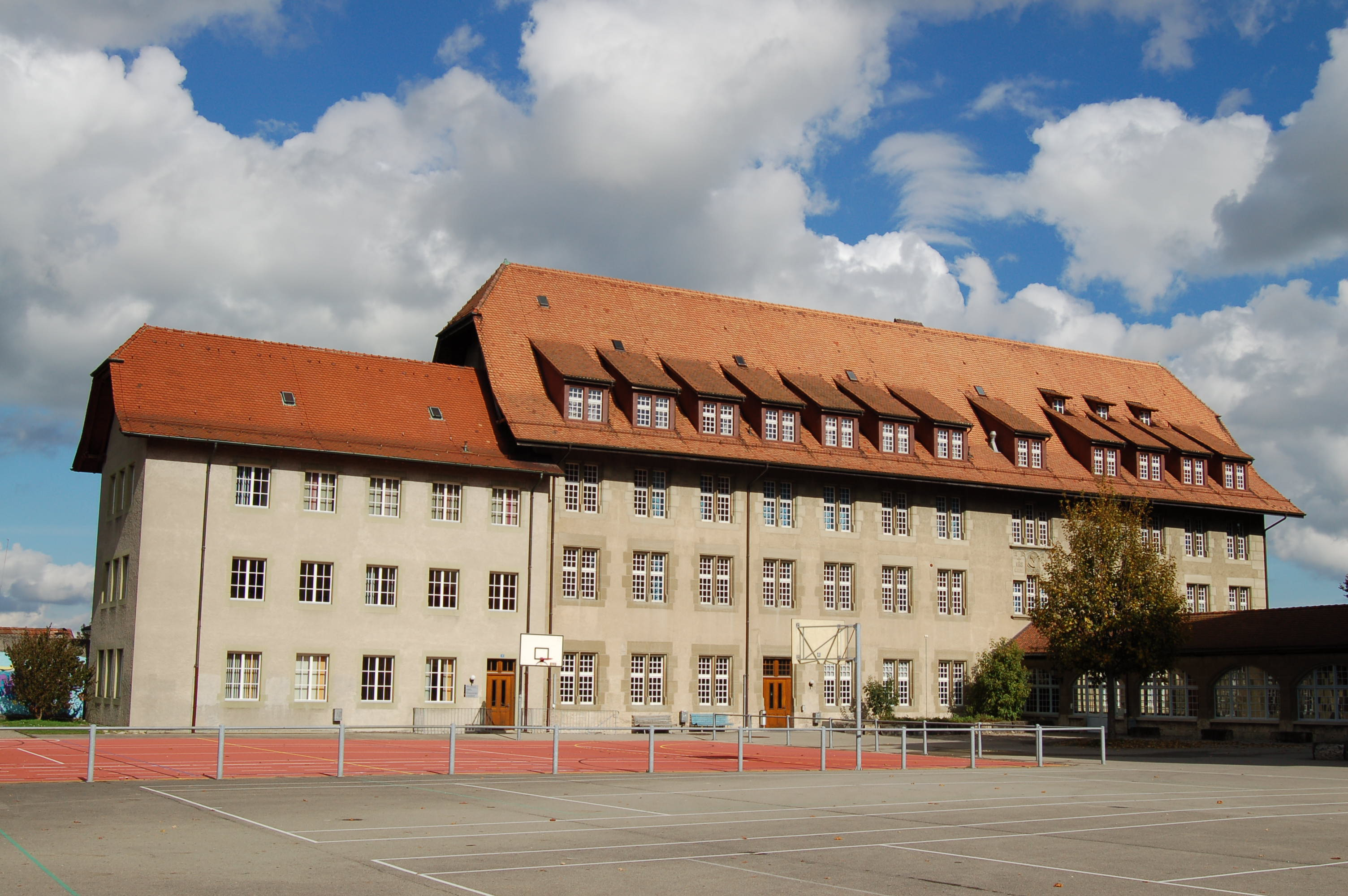

Location
- Fribourg, FR; Switzerland
- Coordinates: 46.80725°N 7.1577°E

Information
- Type: public and secular secondary school 2 (High school)
- Motto: Laudamus veteres sed nostris utimur annis (“We praise the elders, but we are of our time”)
- Established: 1582
- Administrator: Hicham Frossard
- Rector: Martin Steinmann
- Website: csmfr.ch

Collège Saint-Michel (German: Kollegium St. Michael) is a Gymnasium school located in Fribourg, Switzerland. It was established in 1582 by the Jesuit order as a boys' school.

It is a public and secular secondary school preparing for university studies. It is located in the heart of the city of Friborg on Belzé hill. It is a mixed and bilingual high school (French, German) which has around 1,300 students. Alongside the gymnasium classes, the school also houses the Passerelle, an adult training course offered to holders of a professional or specialized maturity. The reputation of Collège St-Michel, founded in 1582, extends well beyond the canton of Friborg and many personalities were trained there.

== Personalities ==
=== Rectors ===
- Pierre Michel (1582–1888)
- Jean-Baptiste Jaccoud (1888–1924)
- Hubert Savoy (1924–1939)
- Romain Pittet (1939–1952)
- Mgr Edouard Cantin (1952–1971)
- Abbé André Bise (1971–1983)
- Michel Corpataux (1983–1989)
- Jean Baeriswyl (1989–1996)
- Nicolas Renevey (1996–2004)
- Jacques de Coulon (2004–2008)
- Matthias Wider (since 2008)

=== Notable teachers ===
- Jean-Pierre Dorand
- Fabrice Hadjadj
- Félicien Morel
- Claude Schorderet
- Denis Clerc
- Michel Bugnon-Mordant
- Laurent Bardy
- Caroline Julen

== Notable alumni ==
- Erich von Däniken, ancient astronaut theorist
- Patrick Aebischer (1954– ), president of the EPFL
- Abbé Joseph Bovet (1879–1951), composer
- Dominique de Buman (1956– ), national councilor
- Jacques Chessex (1934–2009), writer
- Michel Dénériaz (1928–1999), radio host and game show
- Joseph Deiss (1946– ), former federal councilor
- Antoine Dousse (1924–2006), bookseller, teacher and writer
- Claude Frochaux (1935), writer, publisher
- Emile Gardaz (1931–2007), poet and writer
- Félix Glutz, vaudois politician
- François Gross (1931–2015), journalist
- Pierre Hemmer (1950–2013), one of the Internet pioneers in Switzerland
- Armin Jordan (1932–2006) orchestra conductor
- Cardinal Charles Journet (1891–1974)
- Anthony Kohlmann (1771–1836), Jesuit educator
- Mgr Pierre Mamie (1920–2008), bishop
- Jules Marmier (1874–1975), Swiss composer, cellist, organist and choirmaster
- Georges Python, conseiller d'État, principal founder in 1891 of the University of Fribourg
- Gaston de Raousset-Boulbon (1817–1854), adventurer, conqueror of the desert of Sonora (Mexico)
- Count Gonzague de Reynold (1880–1970), historian and writer
- Léon Savary (1895–1968), writer and journalist
- Peter Scholl-Latour (1924–2014), journalist
- Vladimir Serbinenko, Switzerland's first gold medallist at the International Mathematical Olympiad
- Father Joseph-Marie Timon-David (1835–1842), founder of Congregation of the Sacred Heart of Jesus
- Ernst Wilczek (1862–1948), botanist

== See also ==
- List of Jesuit schools
