= Roselyne Crausaz =

Swiss politician (born 1943)

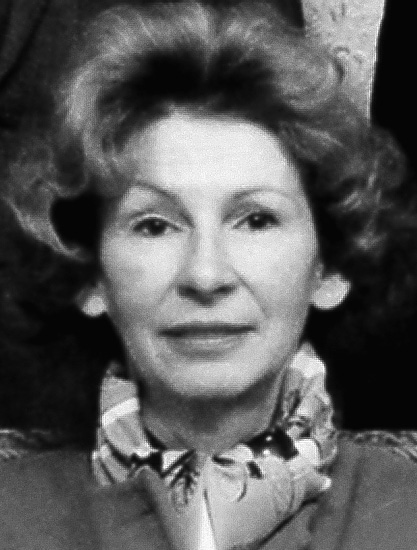
- Born: Roselyne Crausaz; March 19, 1943; Fribourg, Switzerland
- Other name: Roselyne Crausaz Németh (married name)
- Education: University of Fribourg (degree in economic and social sciences, 1967)
- Occupations: Politician, civil servant
- Years active: 1968–1991 (politics)
- Political party: Christian Democratic Party; Swiss People's Party (1995)
- Spouse: Zoltán Németh (m. 1988)
- Parent(s): Aloys Crausaz; Yvonne Ayer

Roselyne Crausaz (born 19 March 1943) is a Swiss politician who was the first woman elected to a cantonal government in French-speaking Switzerland. A member of the Christian Democratic Party, she served on the Council of State of the Canton of Fribourg from 1986 to 1991, where she headed the Department of Public Works.

== Early life and education ==
Roselyne Crausaz was born on 19 March 1943 in Fribourg to a Catholic family. Her father, Aloys Crausaz, was a department head at the cantonal police directorate, and her mother was Yvonne Ayer. She attended the Saint-Joseph Institute in La Gouglera, Chevrilles, and later the Gambach College in Fribourg.

Crausaz pursued higher education at the University of Fribourg, where she earned a degree in economic and social sciences in 1967. Following her graduation, she began her career in federal administration in 1968 as a scientific collaborator at the Federal Statistical Office.

== Federal career ==
From 1969 to 1986, Crausaz worked in the federal administration, serving as deputy section head responsible for university aid within the Science and Research Division. This division underwent several organizational changes during her tenure, becoming the Office of Science and Research in 1973 and later the Federal Office of Education and Science in 1979, all under the Federal Department of Home Affairs.

== Political career ==
=== Early involvement ===
Crausaz began her political involvement in the 1970s, becoming active in various women's associations. She co-founded the Fribourg section of the Swiss Association of University Women in 1970 and established the Women and Society Commission of the Fribourg Christian Democratic Party in 1978.

Starting in 1980, she took on various political mandates, serving as a Christian Democratic deputy in the Grand Council of Fribourg from 1980 to 1986. She also served as a general councillor for the city of Fribourg from 1982, including a term as president in 1982-1983.

=== State Council election and tenure ===
In 1986, Crausaz's candidacy for the State Council of Fribourg created significant attention. As the only woman among the candidates, her subsequent election made her the first woman to enter a cantonal government in French-speaking Switzerland. She was sworn in on 30 December 1986.

As head of the Department of Public Works, Crausaz initiated important projects in transportation infrastructure, spatial planning, and environmental protection. Initially celebrated as a competent and authentically centrist politician, she later faced numerous attacks that were often tinged with sexism toward the end of her mandate. Critics simultaneously accused her of presumed incompetence and an arrogant posture, while paradoxically also criticizing her for being too open to dialogue.

=== Electoral defeat ===
In the 1991 State Council elections, Crausaz finished sixth out of 21 candidates in the first round. Her own party abandoned her, forcing her to withdraw from the second round in favor of the three best-performing Christian Democratic candidates.

== Later career ==
After her unsuccessful candidacy for the Swiss National Council on a Swiss People's Party list in 1995, Crausaz ended her political career. She subsequently worked in public communication consulting and congress organization. She remained active in numerous local and international associations focused on educational, cultural, and social issues, including Soroptimist International. In the late 1990s, she served as a member of the federal commission for Old-age and survivors' insurance.

== Personal life ==
In 1988, Crausaz married Zoltán Németh, a sports teacher of Hungarian origin.

== Bibliography ==
=== Works by Crausaz ===
- La diversification de l'enseignement tertiaire (1974)
- Le bilan social de l'université (with others, 1982)
- Review of the 1970s (with Ludwig Gieseke, 1983)

=== Archival sources ===
- Gosteli Foundation Archive, Worblaufen, Roselyne Crausaz File

=== Secondary sources ===
- La Liberté, 3 November 1986
- Die Weltwoche, 26 May 1988
- Freiburger Nachrichten, 29 October 1991
- L'Hebdo, 21 November 1991
- Girsberger, Esther. Abgewählt. Frauen an der Macht leben gefährlich. 2004, pp. 46-59
- Andrey, Georges; Clerc, John et al. Le Conseil d'Etat fribourgeois 1848-2011. Son histoire, son organisation, ses membres. 2012
