= Pierre-André Page =

Swiss farmer and politician

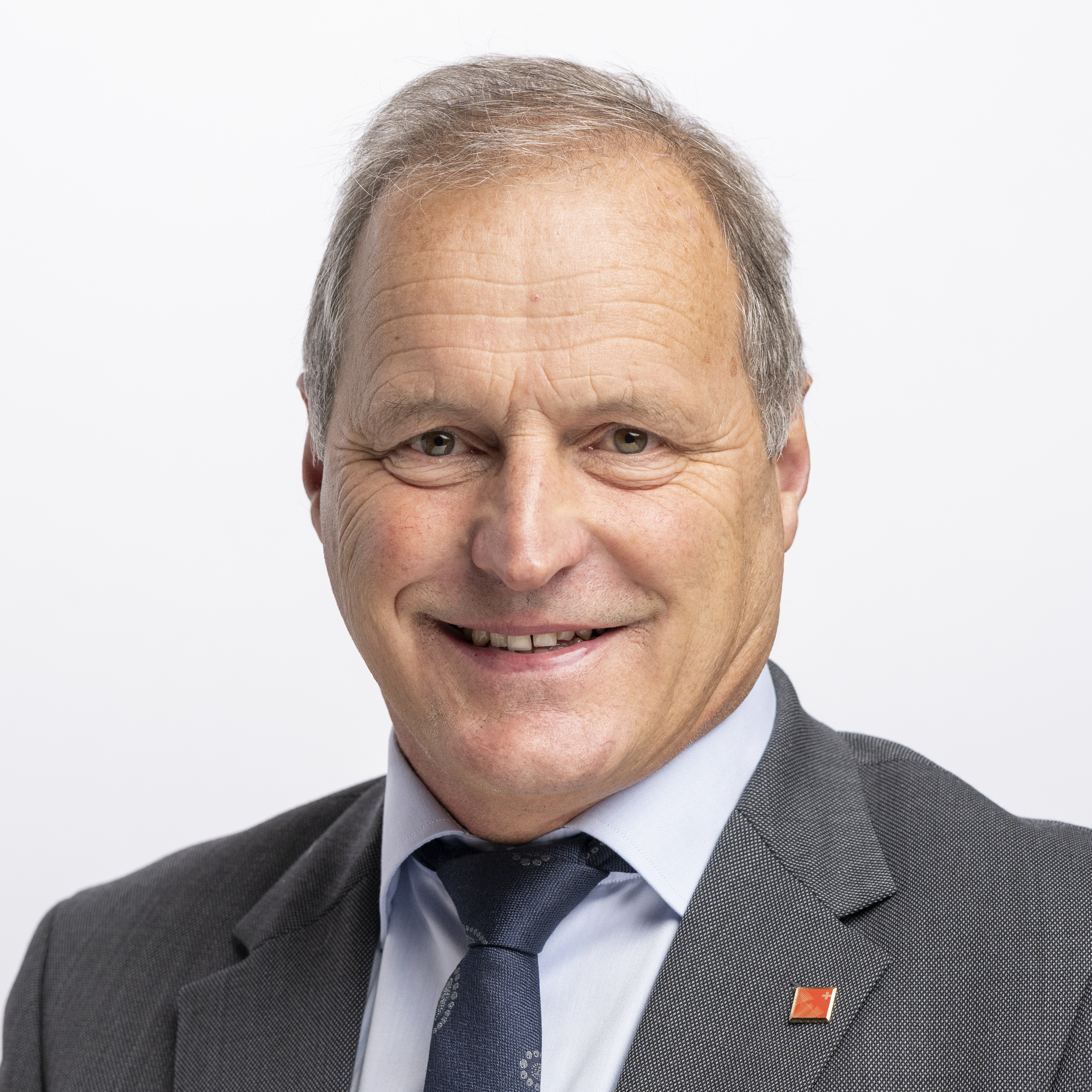
- Official portrait, 2023

President of the National Council
- Incumbent
- Assumed office 1 December 2025
- Preceded by: Maja Riniker

Member of the National Council
- Incumbent
- Assumed office 30 November 2015

Member of the Grand Council of Fribourg
- In office 1996–2015

Personal details
- Born: Pierre-André Page; 19 April 1960 (age 66) Riaz, Fribourg, Switzerland
- Party: Swiss People's Party
- Spouse: Isabelle Roth
- Website: Official website (in French)

Military service
- Branch/service: Swiss Armed Forces
- Rank: Soldier

Pierre-André Page (French pronunciation: [piɛʁʁɛ-andʁe paʒɛ]; born 19 April 1960) is a Swiss farmer and politician who serves in the National Council as a member of Swiss People's Party since 2015. Prior to his tenure in the National Council he was a member of the Grand Council of Fribourg from 1996 to 2015.

== Early life and education ==
Pierre-André Page was born in Riaz, Switzerland, on 19 April 1960, to Camilla Page-Baumgartner. He operates a 62-hectare dairy farm. He received a federal certificate of proficiency from the Agricultural School in Grangeneuve. He graduated with a Master's degree in agriculture in 1986.

== Career ==
In Châtonnaye, Page was a councillor from 1991 to 1996, deputy mayor from 1996 to 2001, and mayor from 2001 to 2006. He was a member of the Grand Council of Fribourg from 1996 to 2015, and chaired it in 2009. He is a member of the Swiss People's Party.

In the 2007 election Page was a candidate for the National Council. In the 2015 and 2019 elections he was elected to the National Council. From 2 December 2019 to 14 December 2023, he was the president of the Commission of Pardons. He is currently the First Vice President of the National Council.

== Personal life ==
Page married Isabelle Roth, with whom he had three children. He played the euphonium and baritone horn in L'Echo des Roches, a village brass band, from 1972 to 2018.

== Political positions ==
Page opposes funding for UNRWA and accuses it of supporting terrorist organisations. He is a member of a committee seeking to place a referendum onto the ballot that would enshrine Swiss neutrality into the constitution.

== Works cited ==
=== News ===
- "On se retrouve seul… C'est assez cruel". La Gruyère. 26 March 2020. Archived from the original on 24 November 2021.
- "Pierre-André Page" (PDF). Swiss People's Party. 2015. Archived (PDF) from the original on 22 June 2025.
- "Swiss aid payments for UNRWA are in doubt". SWI swissinfo. 28 January 2024. Archived from the original on 22 June 2025.
- "Swiss neutrality initiative submitted with almost 133,000 signatures". SWI swissinfo. 11 April 2024. Archived from the original on 22 June 2025.
- Haenni, Urs (18 October 2011). "Die politische Lehrzeit ist abgeschlossen". Freiburger Nachrichten. Archived from the original on 22 June 2025.

=== Web ===
- "Pierre-André Page". Federal Assembly. Archived from the original on 22 June 2025.
- "Pierre-André Page". Pierre-André Page. Archived from the original on 22 June 2025.
