= Nicolas Kolly =

Swiss politician (born 1986)

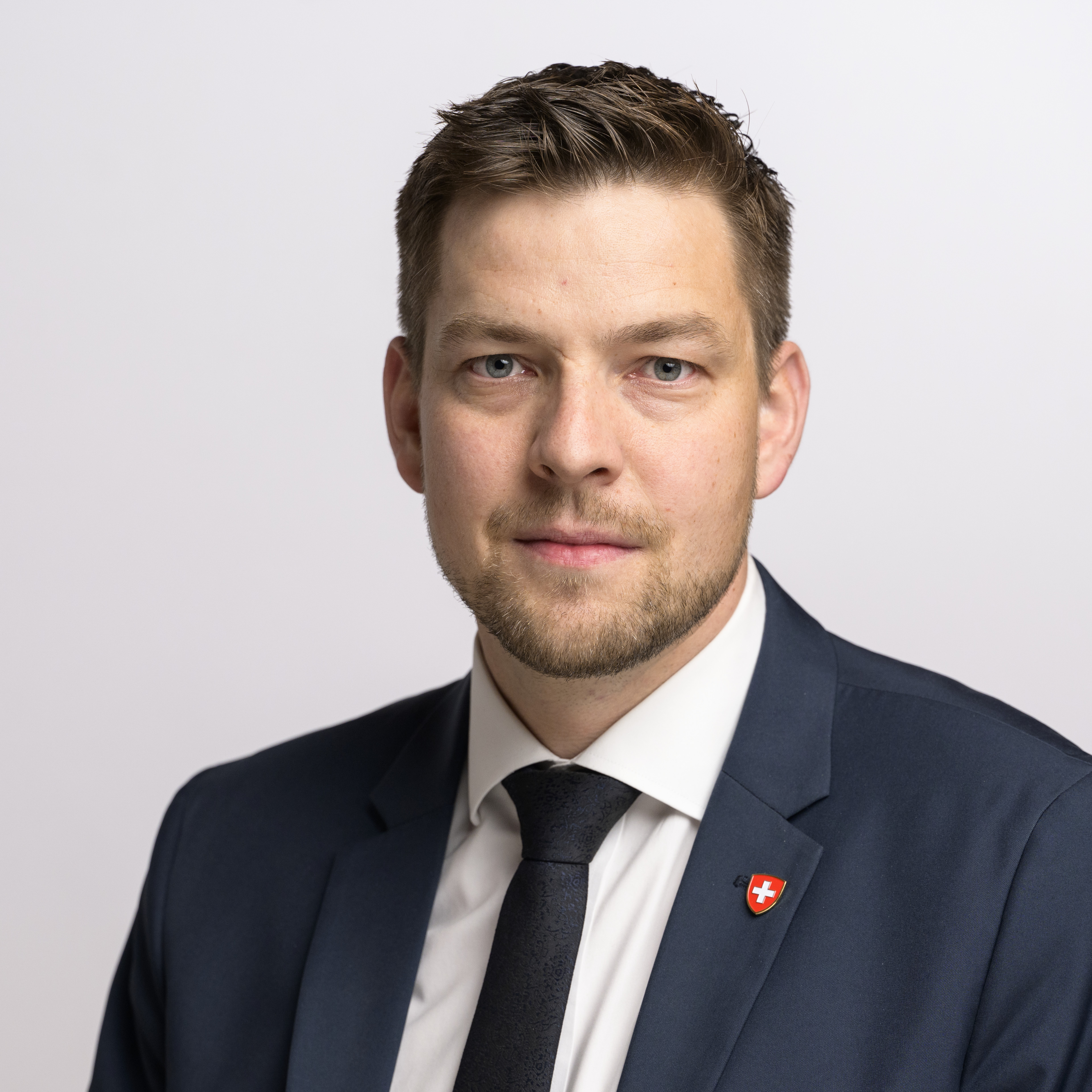
- Official portrait, 2023

Member of the National Council (Switzerland)
- Incumbent
- Assumed office 4 December 2023
- Preceded by: Ursula Schneider Schüttel
- Constituency: Canton of Fribourg

Member of the Grand Council of Fribourg
- In office 2011–2023

Personal details
- Born: Nicolas Kolly; 13 April 1986 (age 40)
- Party: Swiss People's Party
- Relations: Gabriel Kolly (grandfather)
- Occupation: Attorney, politician
- Website: Official website Parliament website

Military service
- Allegiance: Switzerland
- Rank: Captain
- Unit: Pontifical Swiss Guard

Nicolas Kolly (French pronunciation: [ni.kɔ.la kɔ.li]; born 13 March 1986) is a Swiss attorney and politician who serves on the National Council (Switzerland) for the Swiss People's Party since 2023. He previously served on the Grand Council of Fribourg between 2011 and 2023. In 2011, Kolly was the youngest elected member aged only 25.

He is a grandson of Gabriel Kolly (1905–1974) who served on the National Council between 1960 and 1963. Kolly did serve two years in the Swiss Armed Forces in the unit of the Pontifical Swiss Guard.
