= Priests of the Sacred Heart of Jesus =

Priests of the Sacred Heart of Jesus may refer to two distinct Roman Catholic orders:

- Congregation of the Sacred Heart of Jesus, founded by Joseph-Marie Timon-David in 1852
- Priests of the Sacred Heart, founded by Leon Dehon in 1878
