= Jane Connors =

Jane Connors may refer to:

- Jane Connors (academic), Australian academic and lawyer
- Jane Connors (police officer), British police officer
