= Gabriel Kolly =

Swiss politician (1905–1974)

- Official portrait, 1960

Member of the National Council (Switzerland)
- In office 5 December 1960 – 1 December 1963

Personal details
- Born: 29 July 1905; Essert, Switzerland
- Died: 4 May 1974 (aged 68); Fribourg, Switzerland
- Spouse: Jeanne Brodard
- Relations: Nicolas Kolly (grandson)
- Children: 11
- Occupation: Farmer, politician, advocate

Gabriel Kolly (29 July 1905 - 4 May 1974) was a Swiss politician who served on the National Council (Switzerland) between 1960 and 1963 for the Swiss People's Party. He previously also served on the Grand Council of Fribourg and was an advocate for farmers and the peasantry.

He was the grandfather of Nicolas Kolly, who was elected into National Council during the 2023 Swiss federal election.
