= Jean Zermatten =

Swiss children's rights specialist

Jean Zermatten (born 2 March 1948 in Sion, Valais) is a specialist of children's rights. He is the son of the Swiss writer Maurice Zermatten. He is Chairman of the UN Committee on the Rights of the Child and is the first Swiss member of this Committee.

After studying law at the University of Fribourg, he became clerk, and later "ad hoc" judge at the Criminal Court for Juveniles in Fribourg. Then he's President and Dean of the Juvenile Court of the Canton of Valais during 25 years. Between 1989 and 1999, he held lectures at the University of Fribourg (Social Work, Arts and Law School). In 2005, he founded the International Institute for the Rights of the Child which he still leads today. He is active in the direction of academics programmes concerning children's rights and protection too.

Jean Zermatten is a member of the UN Committee for the Rights of the Child, since 2005; he was elected as the Chairperson of this UN Treaty body in May 2011.

In 2007, he received the title of Doctor honoris causa from the University of Fribourg.

Jean Zermatten also contributed to draft law projects:

- charged by the Swiss Confederation to draft a Project for the 1st unified Law for the criminal Procedure for Minors
- charged by the cantons from the Latin part of Switzerland to draft an inter-cantonal concordat on the implementation of measures for young offenders. This concordat has been accepted in October 2003
- collaborated to the creation of the first Swiss children's rights network, gathering more than 50 Swiss NGOs

He was the President of the Swiss society for the criminal law for juveniles as well as the President of the International Association of Magistrates for Youth and Family (IAMYF).

== Publications ==
- 2012: The Rights of the Child in Internationdal Law – Rights of the Child in a Nutshell and in Context: all about Children’s Rights (co-author with Nevena Vuckovic Sahovic and Jaap E. Doek), Stämpfli Publishers, Bern 2012
- 2007: Realizing the Rights of the Child (co-editor with Caroll Bellamy), Université de Zürich, Chair of Political Philosophy
- 2007: 18 Candles. The Convention of the Child Reaches Majority (co-editor with Jane Connors and Anastasia Panayotidis (OHCHR), IDE, Sion
- 2004 : 10 petits Contes pour ne pas s’endormir, Les droits de l’enfant, Éditions Saint-Augustin, Saint-Maurice
- 2002 : Tribunal des mineurs : le petit tailleur et autres histoires de galère, collection Aire de famille, St. Augustin, Suisse
