= Léon Savary =

Swiss writer (1895–1968)

- Born: April 29, 1895; Fleurier, Switerland
- Died: February 17, 1968 (aged 72); Boudry, Switzerland
- Occupations: Writer; journalist
- Spouse: Julia Charmot

Léon Savary (29 April 1895 – [17 February 1968) was a Swiss French-speaking writer and journalist from Payerne, Vaud.

== Biography ==
Savary was the son of a German Russified aristocratic mother from the Baltic region (Von Paucker) and a father who was Protestant Reformed pastor from Vaud and was a converted to Roman Catholicism. After studying Human Sciences at the University of Fribourg, he worked from 1921 to 1923 for the Geneva newspaper La Tribune de Genève, in Geneva, and correspondent in Bern (1935–1946) and Paris (1946–1956). He was Historian of the city of his own choice Fribourg. He wrote about twenty books, most of them are not published anymore, being Fribourg (1929), Le Collège Saint-Michel (1932), and La Chartreuse de la Valsaint (1937) the most important of them.

With René de Weck and Gonzague de Reynold, he formed the troika of Fribourg writers of the early twentieth century.

He contributed to the publication of novels with critical descriptions of intellectual and religious milieus, as well as chronicles and memoirs. His only novel translated into German (by Werner Johannes Guggenheim) was Die Herde ohne Hirte (The Herd Without a Shepherd), published in 1943 by Büchergilde Gutenberg. In 1944, Savary was one of the founders of the Vaud Writers' Association (Association Vaudoise des Écrivains). A close associate of the nonconformist radio host and satirist Jack Rollan, he published the polemical essay Voulez-vous être conseiller national? in 1958 and was a member of the student fraternity Belles-Lettres.

He had a great knowledge of the Swiss political system and habits. In Letters with Suzanne (French: Lettres à Suzanne, Lausanne, Switzerland, 1949), he denounced "the occult influence of hitlerism on Swiss people during the second world war inside the Swiss territory, which were not conscious of being under". About Swiss Politic in general, in the same book, covering the Federal Palace, he said, with his alert and sharp pen: "The Swiss do not desire great men, and in politics, they are afraid to have them. What they like is honesty and average aptitude to manage public affairs like a shop. They mistrust superiority and, let us frankly admit, they are horrified at genius. No geniuses, no saints, even talent is suspect. It is enough to say that a politician who showed signs of surpassing the low water mark would be promptly subject to public discredit".

After coming back from Paris in 1956, he spent the end of his life in the cities of Vevey and Bulle.

== Works ==
- Le secret de Joachim Ascalles, 1923
- Manido chez les genevois,1927.
- Fribourg, Payot, Lausanne, 1929.OCLC 12515493
- Le Collège Saint-Michel, 1932.
- La chartreuse de La Valsainte, 1937.OCLC 34067593
- Le fardeau léger, 1938.
- Le cordon d'argent, 1940.
- La fin d'un mensonge, 1940.
- Le troupeau sans berger, 1942.
- En passant, la Tribune de Genève editions, 1942.
- Au seuil de la sacristie, 1942.OCLC 35332461
- The Flock Without a Shepherd. Zurich 1943.
- Au seuil de la sacristie. 1944.
- Lettres à Suzanne, 1949.
- Le cendrier d'Erymanthe, 1953.OCLC 35332466
- Les anges gardiens, 1953.
- Le fonds des ressuscités, mémoirs, first volume, 1956.OCLC 29859521
- Voulez-vous être conseiller national?, 1958.OCLC 25045376
- Les balances faussées, mémoirs, second volume, 1966.
- La bibliothèque de Sauvives, 1970.OCLC 422068208
- L'âme de Genève, Slatkine, Geneva, 1978.OCLC 15696663
- œuvres maîtresses, five volumes, Slatkine, Geneva, 1978.OCLC 15696661

== Awards ==
Léon Savary won the Schiller Prize in 1960.

== Literature ==
- Roger Francillon (Hrsg.): Histoire de la littérature en Suisse romande. Band 2. Payot, Lausanne 1997, ISBN 2-601-03183-2, S. 389 f.
- "Léon Savary; Andreas Schwab (Übersetzung)" in German, French and Italian in the online Historical Dictionary of Switzerland.
- Charles Linsmayer: Literaturszene Schweiz. 157 Kurzportraits von Rousseau bis Gertrud Leutenegger. Unionsverlag, Zürich 1989, ISBN 3-293-00152-1, S. 212 f.
- Léon Savary (1895–1968). In: La Revue de Belles-Lettres. Genf, 1974, Jg. 98, Heft 4; ISSN 0035-1016.
- Maurice Zermatten et al.: Léon Savary à l’occasion de son soixante-dixième anniversaire. Éd. du Panorama, P. Thierrin, Biel 1965, OCLC 370604281.

== Bibliography ==
- Maurice Zermatten: Léon Savary à l’occasion de son soixante-dixième anniversaire. Bienne, 1965. OCLC 14085529
- Charles Linsmayer: Literaturszene Schweiz. 157 Kurzportraits von Rousseau bis Gertrud Leutenegger. Unionsverlag, Zürich, 1989, ISBN 978-3-293-00152-7 (P. 212 ss)
