= Maurice Zermatten =

French-speaking Swiss writer

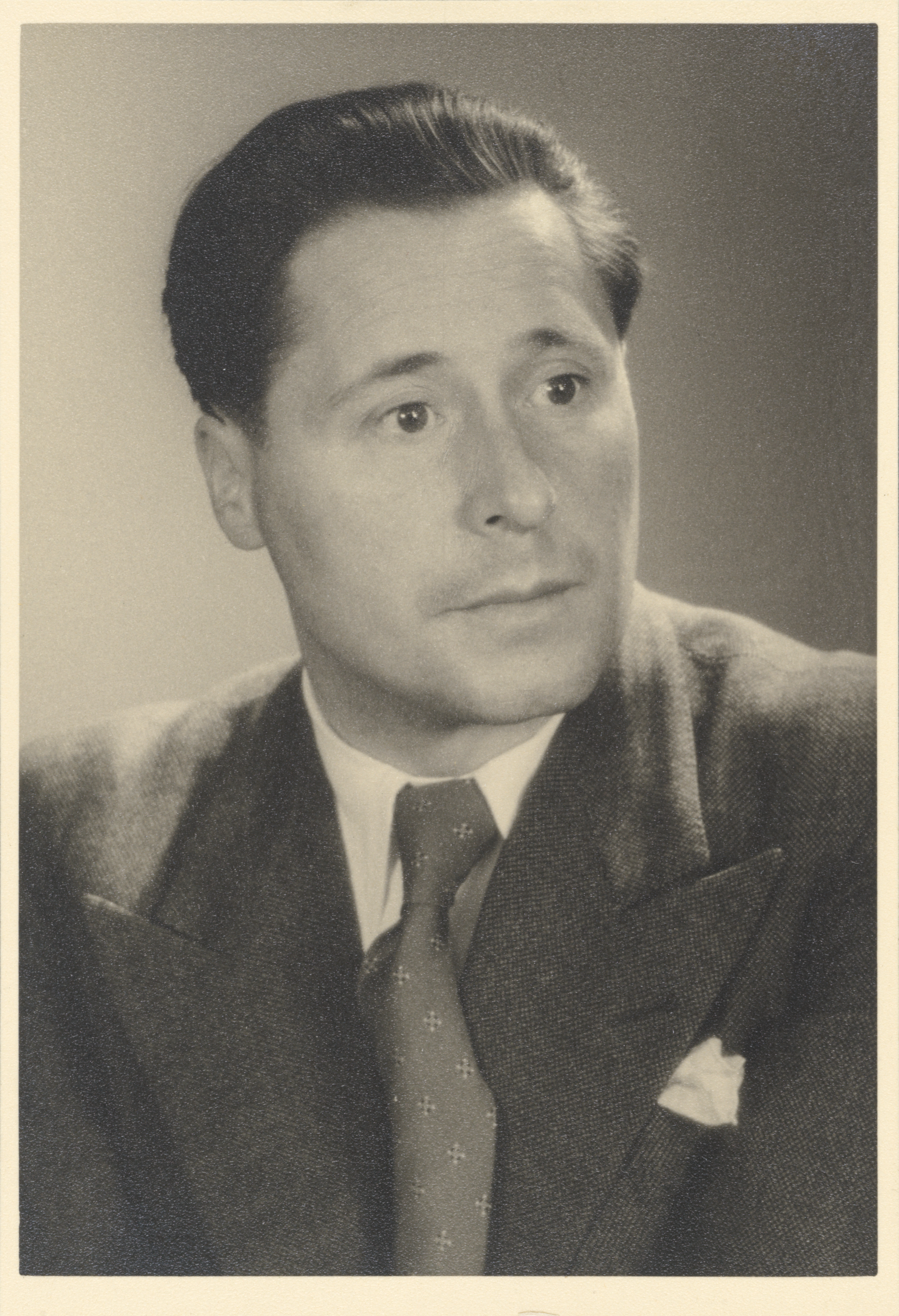
Maurice Zermatten in 1955

Maurice Zermatten (22 October 1910, in Saint-Martin, Valais – 11 February 2001, in Sion) was a French-speaking Swiss writer.

He was born in Saint-Martin, Valais, a small village situated in the Val d'Hérens, in the canton of Valais. He was first educated at the École normale and then at the University of Fribourg.

== Career ==
He published his first novel Le Coeur inutile in 1936 at the age of 26. He taught at the College of Sion where he stayed until retirement. In 1952, he became a lecturer in (French Literature) at the Swiss Federal Institute of Technology Zürich. Maurice Zermatten also performed a military career leading him to the rank of colonel.

He dedicated himself to several literary genres like novels, storytelling, theatre pieces, and short stories.

Zermatten published about 120 books; most of them are novels. Zermatten described the novel as "a complete kind where the author creates characters, history and environment. It is a fiction that reflects reality as it draws its imagination in life."

He dedicated works to writers: Charles Ferdinand Ramuz, Léon Savary, Rainer Maria Rilke, Gonzague de Reynold and also to painters: Théodore Strawinsky, Charles Menge, Georges Borgeaud, Paul Monnier and Fernand Dubuis.

== Personal life ==
He married Hélène Zermatten (née Kaiser) in 1941. The couple had six children, including children's rights specialist Jean Zermatten. Following Hélène's death in 2007, their children established the Maurice Zermatten Foundation in 2009, as requested in her will.

== Prizes and distinctions ==
Zermatten won several distinctions like: Prix Schiller (1938 and 1956), Grand prix catholique de littérature for all his work (1959), Gottfried Keller Prize (1959), Prix de l'Académie française (1960).

He also became an Officer of the French Order of Arts and Letters (Officier de l’Ordre du mérite national français des arts et des lettres) and honorary citizen of Sion (1976) (Bourgeois d'honneur de la ville de Sion).
