= Maja Riniker =

Swiss politician (born 1978)

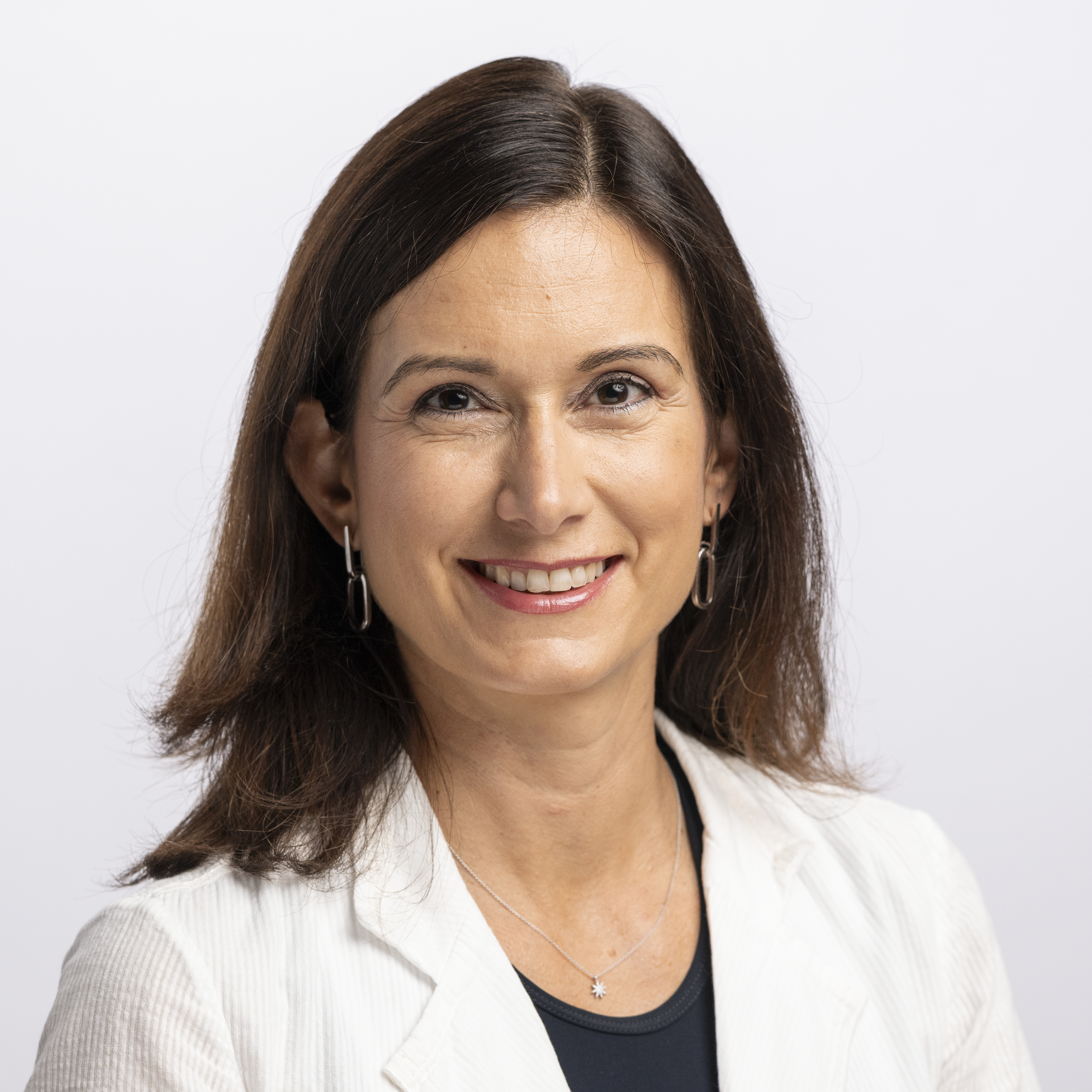
- Official portrait, 2023

President of the National Council
- In office 2 December 2024 – 1 December 2025
- Preceded by: Eric Nussbaumer
- Succeeded by: Pierre-André Page

First Vice President of the National Council
- In office 4 December 2023 – 2 December 2024
- Preceded by: Eric Nussbaumer
- Succeeded by: Pierre-André Page

Member of the National Council
- Incumbent
- Assumed office 2019

Member of the Grand Council of Aargau
- In office 2013–2019

Personal details
- Born: Maja Regula Baumann; 23 May 1978 (age 48) Aarau, Switzerland
- Party: The Liberals
- Spouse: Florian Riniker (m. 2004; sep. 2026)
- Children: 3

Maja Regula Riniker (German pronunciation: [ˈmaːja ˈʁiːnɪkɐ]; née Baumann; born 23 May 1978) is a Swiss economist and politician who currently serves on the National Council (Switzerland) for The Liberals since 2019. She was President of the National Council from 2024 to 2025.

In 2026, Riniker was elected to Executive Council of Aargau, upon which assumption she will leave the National Council. Her successor will be Adrian Schoop.

== Early life and education ==
Riniker was born Maja Regula Baumann on 23 May 1978 in Aarau, Switzerland, the oldest of three children, to Rudolf "Ruedi" Baumann (1950–2022), an architect, and Marlis Baumann (née Meyerstein), into a left-leaning family.

Her father served on the municipal council of Lenzburg for the Social Democratic Party from 1974 to 1976 and was a partner in the architecture firm Baumann & Waser. Her mother was a teacher. Through her patrilineal line she holds three places of origin in Villigen, Habsburg and Lenzburg. She is of partial German Jewish descent.

She was primarily raised in Lenzburg attending primary and high school there. Ultimately, Riniker completed a commercial apprenticeship at Swiss Bank Corporation in Aarau, accompanied by a graduation with a Matura. During her initial professional years working in banking and consulting, Riniker remotely completed studies in Economics.

== Professional career ==
Following she worked for banks in Zürich before in 2003 she returned to Aarau. In Aarau she worked in the administration of her husbands medical clinic. In 2020, she resigned from the office.

== Political career ==
Maja Riniker held her first speech in the National Council, in 1995, then as a member of the Scouts. Riniker was elected into the school commission of Suhr with twenty-seven years of age. After eight years she resigned, when her first child entered school. Since about 2009 she was a co-president of the cantonal women's branch of the FDP for 10 years. She is currently an honorary member of the women's branch. Riniker entered into the Gand Council of Aargau in 2014, as the successor of Beat Rüetschi. In the grand Council, she was the president of the Public Security Commission for three years. In 2017, Riniker was considered a candidate to the municipality of Suhr, but she declined.

=== Member of the National Council ===
She run both in 2011 and 2015 as a candidate for the National Council, but was not elected. In November 2018, Riniker was nominated a candidate for the National Council for Aargau by the Suhr branch of the FDP. In the National council she took a seat in the Security Commission. In September 2022, she was nominated as the second vicepresidency of the National Council by the FDP, to which the party was entitled. In November 2022, she was elected. Riniker was reelected in 2023 to the National Council. In December 2024 she assumed the presidency of the National Council, after serving as first vice-president from December 2023. She served as President until December 2025 when she was succeeded by Pierre-André Page (SVP).

=== Political positions ===
She supports a stronger military and also the purchase of a new fighter jet. In December 2021 she supported the establishment of a Cybercommando in the Swiss army. In December 2021, after she became aware that the Swiss army was called to assist in the vaccination during the COVID-19 pandemic, she demanded that other options such as the Swiss Civilian Service should be considered first. In September 2020, she was elected the president of the Federation of the Swiss Civilian Service (SZSV).

== Personal life ==
In 2004, Baumann married Florian Riniker, a physician and journalist, with whom she had three children. In 2026, Riniker separated from her husband.

She separates municipal politics from family life and left the local school commission in which she was active for eight years until her first child entered school. Also the candidacy for the presidency of the municipality of Suhr she declined for the same reason.
