= Ursula Schneider Schüttel =

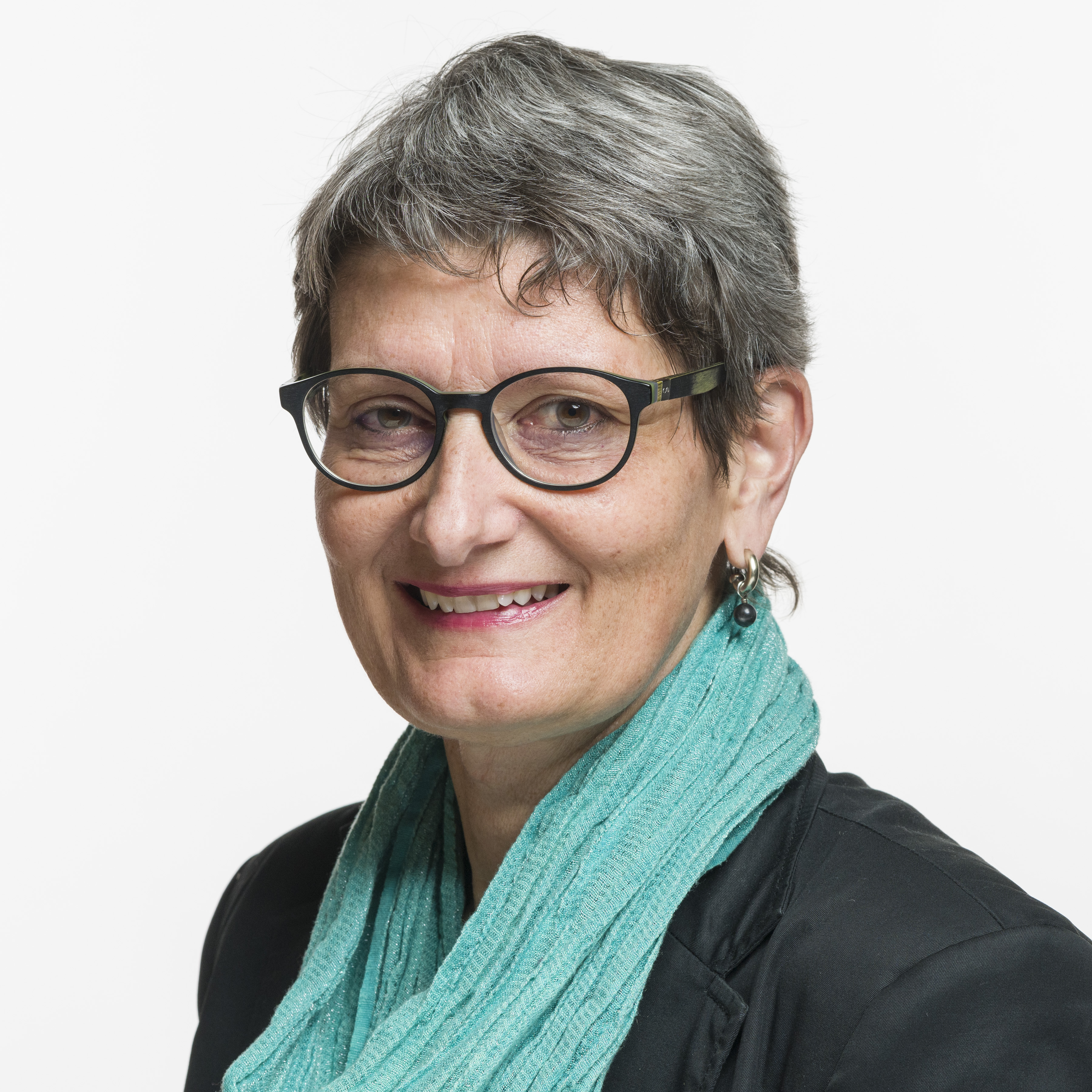
- Official portrait, 2019

Member of National Council (Switzerland)
- In office 27 February 2012 – 3 December 2023
- Preceded by: Christian Levrat
- Constituency: Canton of Fribourg

Member of Grand Council of Fribourg
- In office 2010–2012

Personal details
- Born: Ursula Schneider; 26 November 1961 (age 64) Bern, Switzerland
- Party: Social Democratic Party
- Spouse: Stefan Schüttel
- Children: 2
- Occupation: Attorney

Ursula Schneider Schüttel (Swiss Standard German pronunciation: [ˈʊrsula ˈʃnaɪdər ˈʃʏtl̩]; née Schneider; born 26 November 1961) is a Swiss politician who served on the National Council from 2012 to 2015 and from 2017 to 2023 for the Social Democratic Party. She lost her seat in the 2023 Swiss federal election after being able to move-up twice in 2015 and 2017. Schneider Schüttel is currently the president of Pro Natura (Switzerland).
