= International Committee on Intellectual Cooperation =

Advisory academic institution to the League of Nations

- Formation: 1922
- Legal status: International organisation
- Location: Geneva

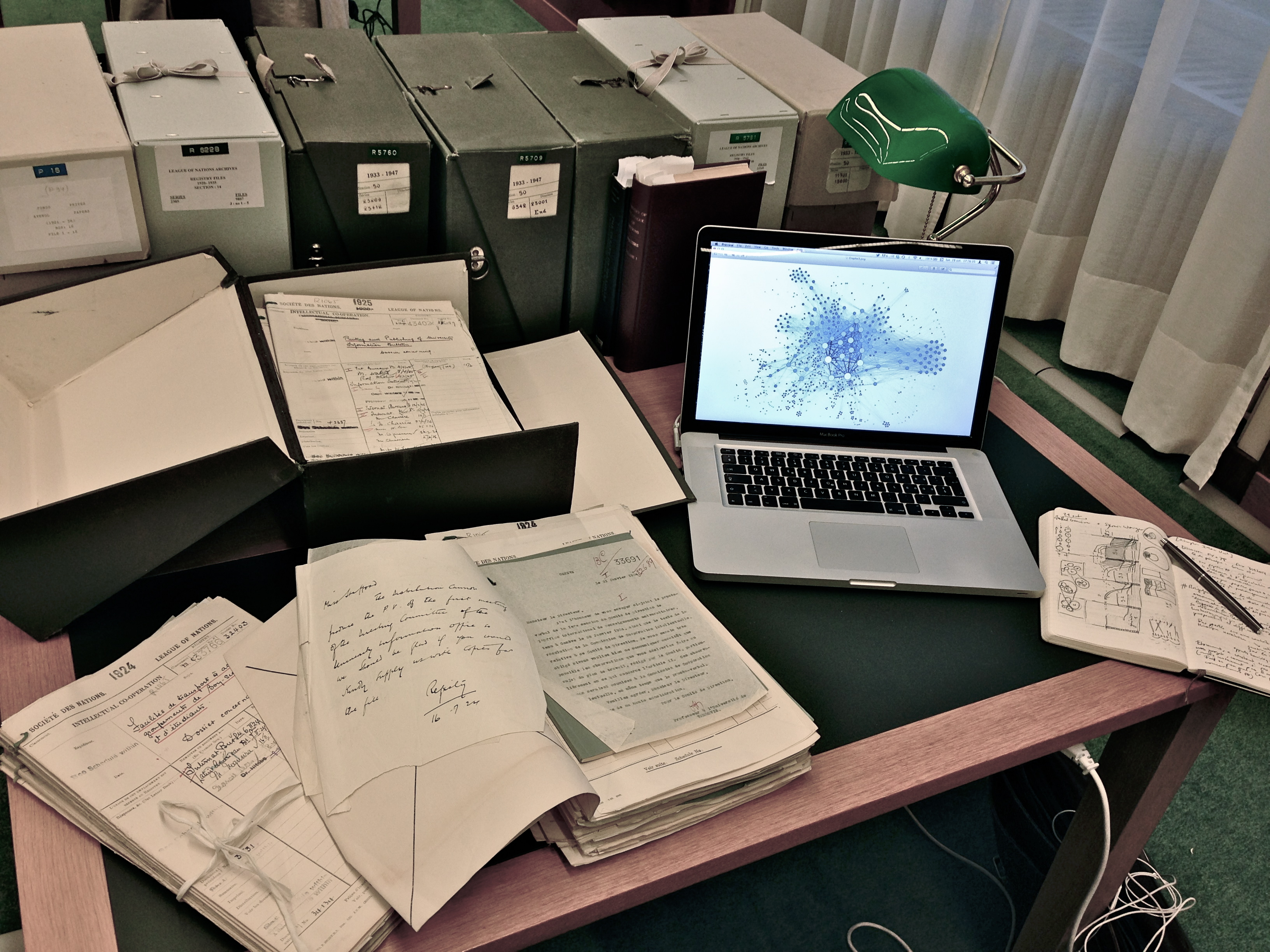
ICIC Archives in Geneva

The International Committee on Intellectual Cooperation, or League of Nations Committee on Intellectual Cooperation, was an advisory organisation for the League of Nations that promoted international exchange between scientists, researchers, teachers, artists and intellectuals. Established in 1922, it counted such figures as Henri Bergson, Albert Einstein, Sarvepalli Radhakrishnan, Jagadish Chandra Bose, Nitobe Inazo, Marie Curie, Gonzague de Reynold, Leonardo Torres Quevedo, and Robert A. Millikan among its members.

In its first years, the committee worked on the protection of intellectual property copyright, library information science (LIS), educational management, education, youth, the future of culture, international cooperation in arts and literature, protection of historical monuments, cooperation between galleries, libraries, archives, and museums (GLAM) etc. It later gave rise to the United Nations Educational, Scientific and Cultural Organization (UNESCO).

== International Committee on Intellectual Cooperation (Geneva) ==
The International Committee on Intellectual Cooperation (ICICIC) was formally established in August 1922. It started out with 12 members, but it later grew to 19 individuals, mostly from Western Europe. The first session was held on August 1, 1922, under the chairmanship of Henri Bergson. During its lifetime, the committee attracted a variety of prominent members, for instance Albert Einstein, Marie Curie, Kristine Bonnevie, Jules Destrée, Robert Andrews Millikan, Alfredo Rocco, Paul Painlevé, Leonardo Torres Quevedo, Gonzague de Reynold, Jagadish Chandra Bose and Sarvepalli Radhakrishnan. Einstein resigned in 1923 in public protest of the committee's inefficacy; he rejoined in 1924 to mitigate the use made by German chauvinists of his resignation. The body was successively chaired by:

- Henri Bergson (1922–1925)
- Hendrik Lorentz (1925–1928)
- Gilbert Murray (1928–1939).

The ICIC maintains a number of sub-committees (such as Museums, Arts and Letters, Intellectual Rights and Bibliography), which also work with figures such as Béla Bartók, Thomas Mann, Salvador de Madariaga and Paul Valéry.

The ICIC works closely with the International Educational Cinematographic Institute, which was created in Rome in 1928 by the Italian government that was led by Benito Mussolini.

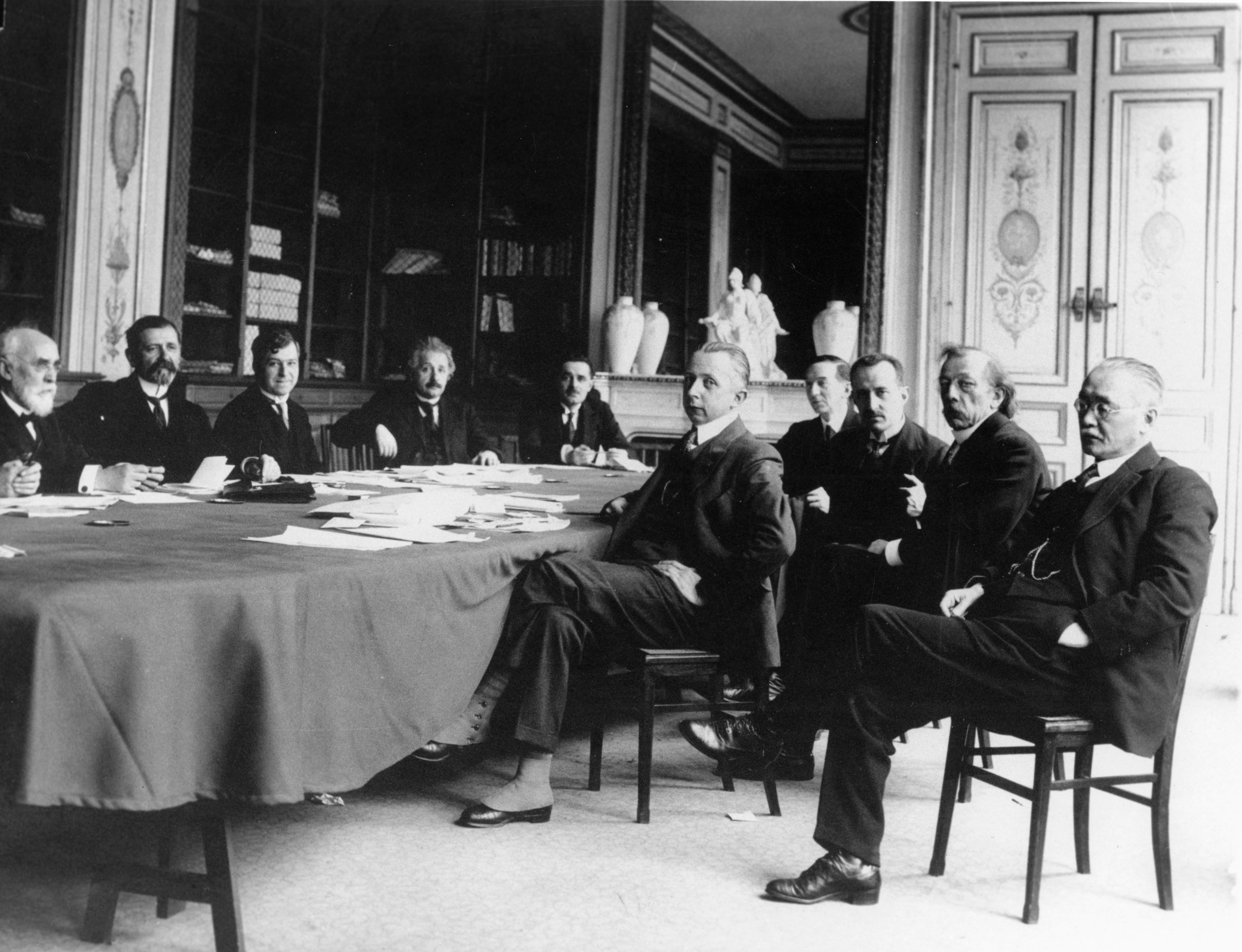
ICIC Plenary session (date unknown, between 1924 and 1927).

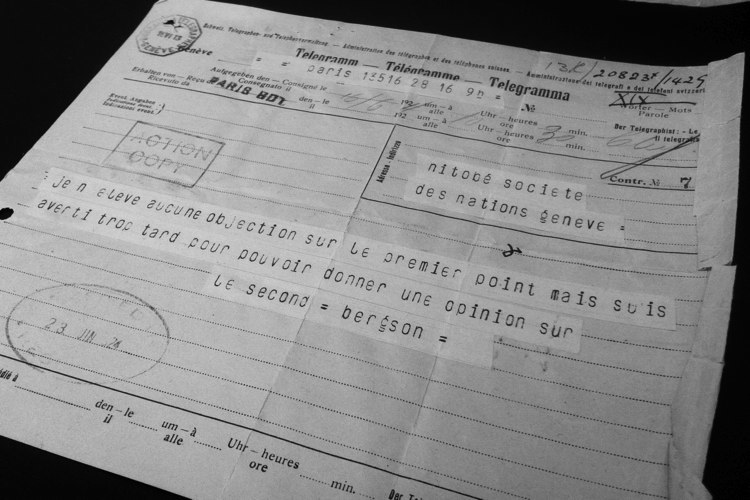
Henri Bergson (ICIC president) to Inazo Nitobe (International Bureaux Section director), 1924.

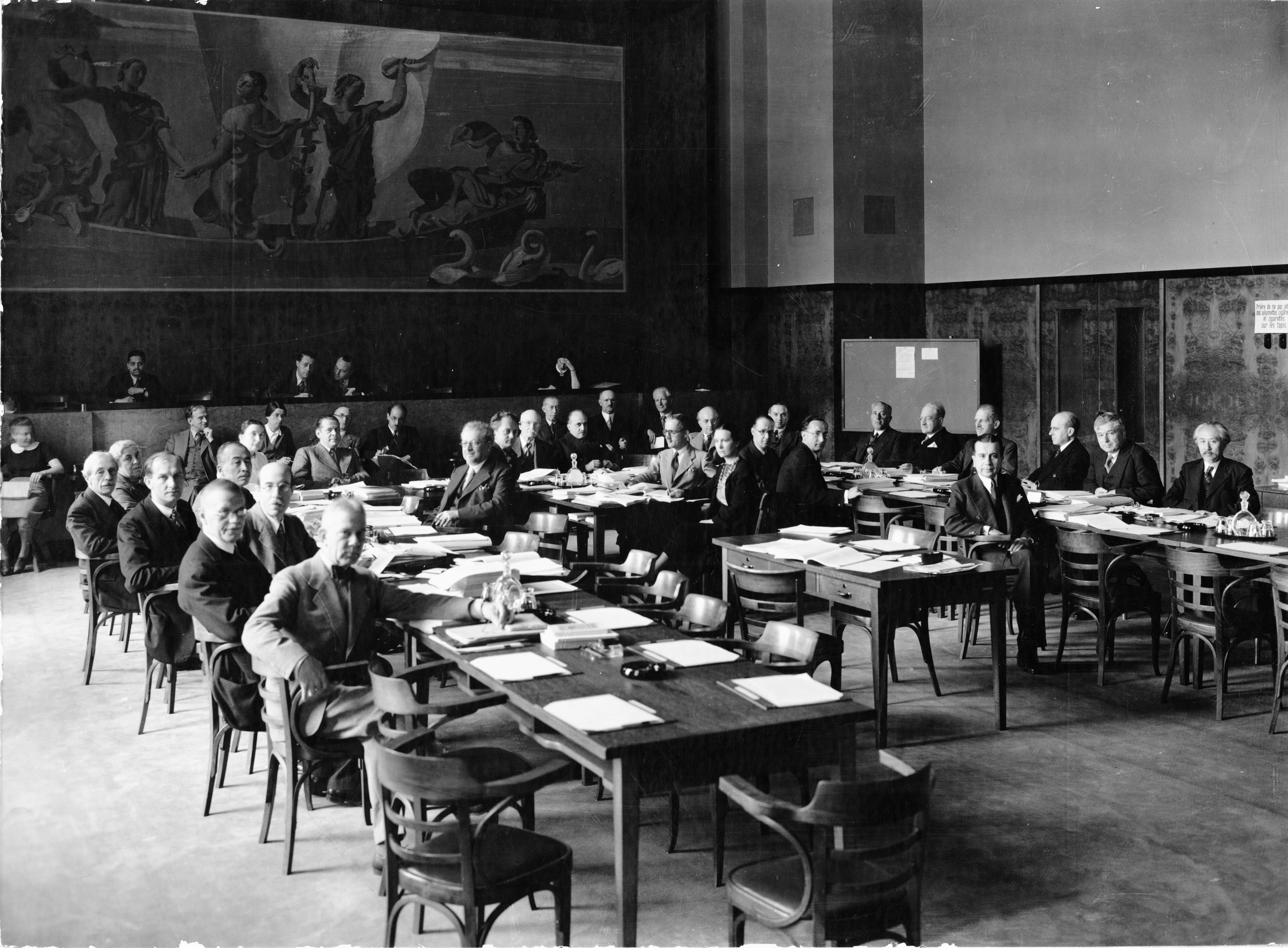
ICIC Plenary session 1939.

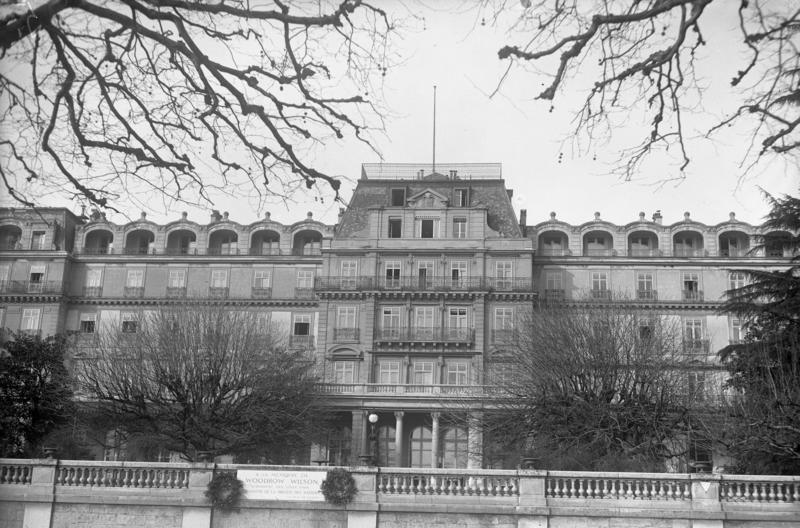
The Palais Wilson (Geneva), seat of the LoN and the ICIC between 1922 and 1937.

== International Institute of Intellectual Cooperation (Paris) ==
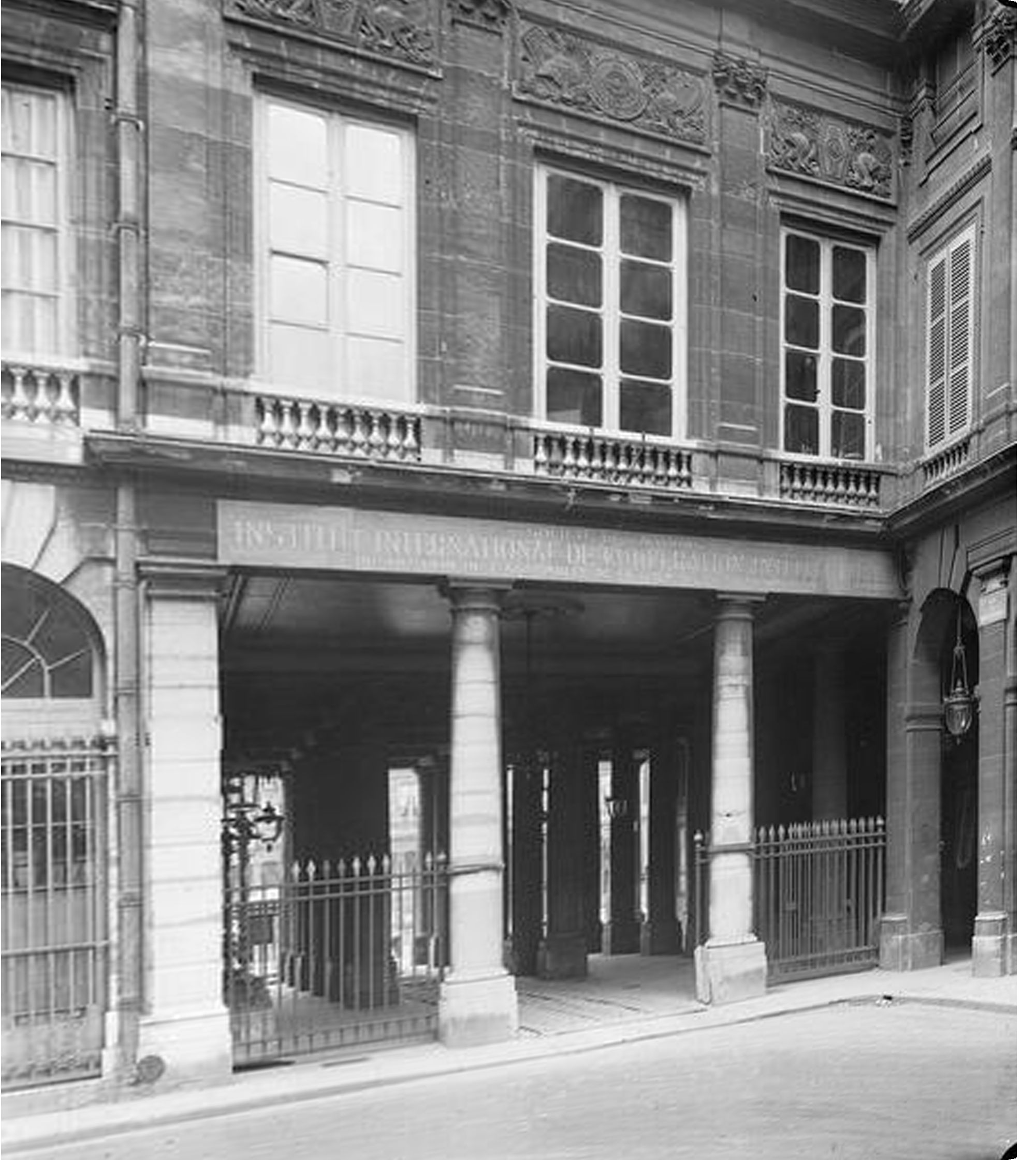
A side of the Palais-Royal, Paris, where the IIIC was installed in 1926.

To support the work of the commission in Geneva, the organization was offered assistance from France to establish an executive branch, the International Institute of Intellectual Cooperation (IIIC), in Paris in 1926. However, the IIIC had an autonomous status and was financed almost only by the French government, which gave it a certain independence that created tensions with the League of Nations. It maintained relations with the League's member states, which established national commissions for intellectual cooperation and appointed delegates to represent their interests at the institute in Paris. The IIIC was an international organisation, but all of its three successive directors were French:

- Julien Luchaire (1926–1930)
- Henri Bonnet (1931–1940)
- Jean-Jacques Mayoux (1945–1946)

From 1926 to 1930, Alfred Zimmern, the well-known British classicist and a pioneering figure in the discipline of international relations, served as its deputy director.

As a result of the Second World War, the institute was closed from 1940 to 1944. It reopened briefly from 1945 to 1946. When it closed permanently in 1946, UNESCO inherited its archives and some parts of its mission. The archives, consisting of 115 linear metres of material spanning from 1925 to 1946, were added to the UNESCO Memory of the World register in 2017.
