= Eugène de Mazenod =

French Catholic saint (1782–1861)

Saint Eugène de Mazenod OMI
- Archbishop of Marseille
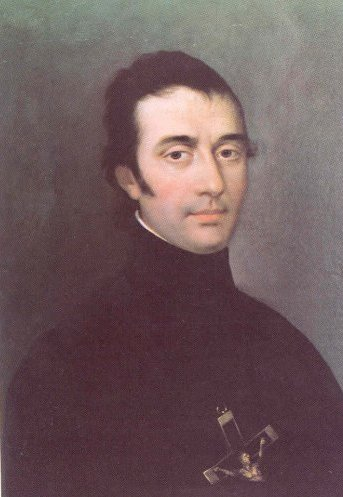

Personal details
- Born: Charles-Joseph-Eugène de Mazenod; 1 August 1782 Aix-en-Provence, France
- Died: 21 May 1861 (aged 78) Marseille, France

Sainthood
- Feast day: May 21
- Venerated in: Catholic Church
- Beatified: 19 October 1975; St. Peter's Basilica, Vatican City by Pope Paul VI
- Canonized: 3 December 1995; St. Peter's Basilica by Pope John Paul II

Ordination history
History
Priestly ordination
- Ordained by: Jean-François de Mandolx
- Date: 21 December 1811
- Place: Amiens
Episcopal consecration
- Principal consecrator: Carlo Odescalchi
- Co-consecrators: Chiarissimo Falconieri Mellini; Luigi Frezza
- Date: 14 October 1832

Eugène de Mazenod, OMI (born Charles-Joseph-Eugène de Mazenod; 1 August 1782 – 21 May 1861) was a French aristocrat and Catholic bishop who founded the congregation of the Missionary Oblates of Mary Immaculate.

When he was eight years old, Mazenod's family fled the French Revolution and left its considerable wealth behind. As refugees in Italy, they were poor and moved from place to place. He returned to France at the age of twenty and later became a priest. Initially focused on rebuilding the Church in France after the Revolution, his mission soon extended, particularly to British North America. Mazenod was appointed bishop of Marseille in 1837, and archbishop in 1851.

Mazenod was beatified on 19 October 1975. He was canonized twenty years later on 3 December 1995. The Catholic Church commemorates him with an optional memorial on 21 May, the anniversary of his death.

== Biography ==
=== Refugee ===
Eugène de Mazenod was born on 1 August 1782 and baptized the following day in the Église de la Madeleine in Aix-en-Provence. His father, Charles Antoine de Mazenod, was one of the Presidents of the Court of Finances, and his mother was Marie Rose Joannis. Eugène began his schooling at the College Bourbon, but it was interrupted by the events of the French Revolution. With the approach of the French revolutionary forces, the family fled to Italy.

Eugène became a boarder at the College of Nobles in Turin (Piedmont), but a move to Venice meant the end to formal schooling. With their money running out, Eugène's father sought various employment, none of which were successful. His mother and sister returned to France and eventually seeking a divorce to be able to regain their seized property. Eugène was fortunate to be welcomed by the Zinelli family in Venice. One of their sons, the priest Bartolo Zinelli, took special care of Eugène and saw to his education in the well-provided family library where the young adolescent spent many hours each day. Don Bartolo was a major influence in the human, academic and spiritual development of Eugène.

Once again the French army chased the émigrés from Venice, forcing Eugène and his father and two uncles to seek refuge in Naples for less than a year, and finally to flee to Palermo in Sicily, where Eugène was invited to become part of the household of the Duke and Duchess of Cannizaro as a companion to their two sons. He took to himself the title of 'Comte' ("Count") de Mazenod and enjoyed living a noble lifestyle.

=== Conversion ===
At the age of twenty, Eugène returned to France and lived with his mother in Aix en Provence. Initially he enjoyed all the pleasures of Aix as a rich young nobleman, intent on the pursuit of pleasure and money, and a rich girl who would bring a good dowry. Gradually he became aware of how empty his life was, and began to search for meaning in more regular church involvement, reading and personal study, and charitable work among prisoners. His journey came to a climax on Good Friday, 1807 when he was 25 years old. Looking at the sight of the Cross, he had a religious experience. He recounted the spiritual experience in his retreat journal:

Can I forget the bitter tears that the sight of the cross brought streaming from my eyes one Good Friday? Indeed they welled up from the heart, there was no checking them, they were too abundant for me to be able to hide them from those who like myself were assisting at that moving ceremony. I was in a state of mortal sin and it was precisely this that made me grieve…Blessed, a thousand times blessed, that He, this good Father, notwithstanding my unworthiness, lavished on me all the richness of his mercy.

=== Priest ===
In 1808, he began his studies for the priesthood at the Saint-Sulpice Seminary in Paris and was ordained a priest at Amiens (Picardy), on 21 December 1811. Since Napoleon had expelled the Sulpician priests from the seminary, Eugène stayed on as a formator for a semester. As a member of the seminary, notwithstanding personal risk, Eugène committed himself to serve and assist Pope Pius VII, who at this time was a prisoner of Emperor Napoleon I at Fontainebleau. In this way he experienced at firsthand the suffering of the post-Revolutionary Church.

On his return to Aix, Father de Mazenod asked not to be assigned to a parish but to dedicate himself fully to evangelising those who were not being reached by the structures of the local church: the poor who spoke only the Provençal language, prisoners, youth and the inhabitants of poor villages who were ignorant of their faith. The goal of his priestly preaching and ministry was always to lead others to develop themselves fully as humans, then as Christians and finally to become saints.

== Founder ==
=== Oblates of Mary Immaculate ===
On 25 January 1816, "impelled by a strong impulse from outside of himself" he invited other priests to join him in his life of total oblation to God and to the most abandoned of Provence. Initially called "Missionaries of Provence", they dedicated themselves to evangelisation through preaching parish missions in the poor villages, youth and prison ministry. In 1818, a second community was established at the Marian shrine of Notre Dame du Laus. This became the occasion for the missionaries to become a religious congregation, united through vows and the evangelical counsels. Changing their name to Missionary Oblates of Mary Immaculate, the group received papal approbation on 17 February 1826.

=== Oblate missions ===
In 1841, Bishop Ignace Bourget of Montreal invited the Oblates to Canada. At the same time, there was an outreach to the British Isles, which was the beginning of a history of missionary outreach to the most abandoned peoples in Canada, the United States, Mexico, England, Ireland, Algeria, Southern Africa and Ceylon during the founder's lifetime. In 200 years, the zeal spread and took root in the establishment of the Oblates in nearly 70 countries.

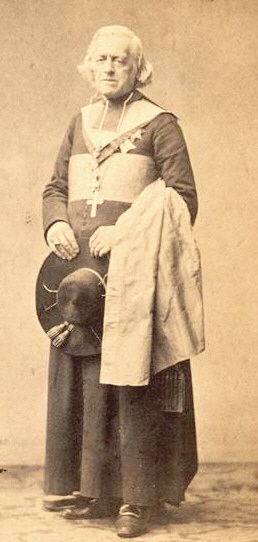
Bishop Mazenod

== Bishop ==
Having for some while helped his uncle, Fortuné de Mazenod, the aged bishop of Marseille, in the administration of his diocese, Mazenod was called to Rome and, on 14 October 1832, consecrated titular bishop of Icosium, which in 1837 he exchanged for that of bishop of Marseille, a position he held until his death in 1861. During his episcopacy, he commissioned Notre-Dame de la Garde, an ornate Neo-Byzantine basilica on the south side of the old port of Marseille. He favoured the moral teachings of Alphonsus Liguori, whose theological system he was the first to introduce in France, and whose first biography in French he caused to be written by one of the Oblates.

He inspired local priest Joseph-Marie Timon-David to found the Congregation of the Sacred Heart of Jesus in Marseille in 1852.

Though renowned for being outspoken, he was made a Peer of the French Empire. In 1851 Pope Pius IX gave him the pallium.

== Veneration ==
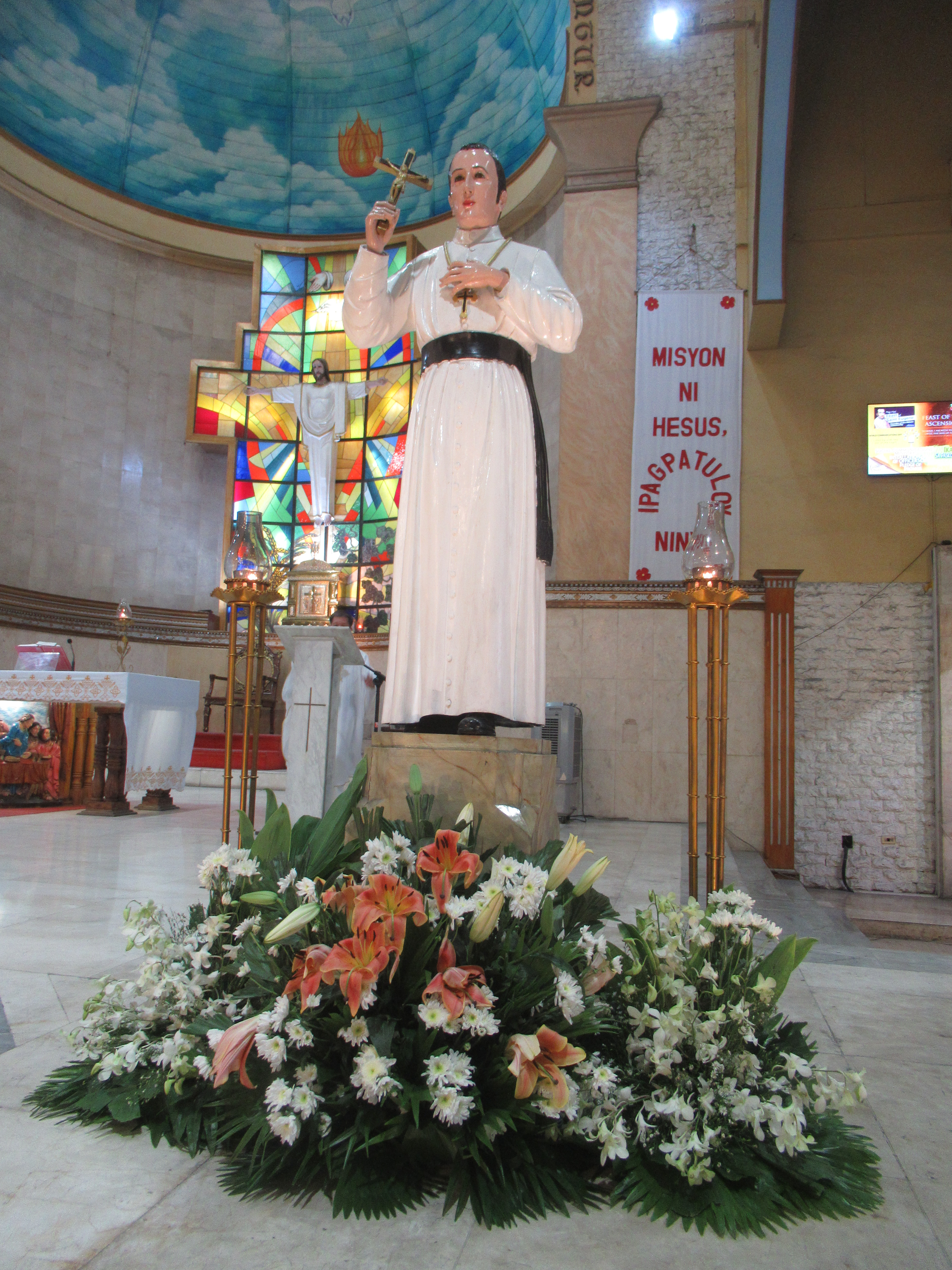
Diocesan Shrine and Parish at Our Lady of Grace, Caloocan

Some forty-five years after his death, the Diocese of Marseille opened a three-year-long investigation for the cause for Bishop de Mazenod's canonization. His spiritual writings were approved by theologians on 22 May 1935 and 14 December 1938. On 15 January 1936, the cause was opened by the Sacred Congregation of Rites, and he was given the title Servant of God. In May 1970, the Congregation for the Causes of Saints recognized the heroic virtue of his life, and he was proclaimed "venerable".

Five years later, after the same congregation attributed miracles of healing to Eugène's intercession, he was beatified by Pope Paul VI in Rome on 19 October 1975.

In December 1994, the Congregation for Saints approved another miracle attributed to Blessed Eugène's intercession. John Paul II celebrated his Mass of canonization in 1995, on 3 December. In his homily at the Mass, celebrated on the First Sunday of Advent, the Pope proclaimed Saint Eugène a "Man of Advent", saying:

Eugène de Mazenod, whom the Church today proclaims a saint, was a man of Advent, a man of the Coming. He not only looked forward to that Coming, but... he dedicated his whole life to preparing for it. His waiting reached the intensity of heroism, that is, it was marked by a heroic degree of faith, hope and apostolic charity. Eugène de Mazenod was one of those apostles who prepared the modern age, our age.
