= Eric Nussbaumer =

Swiss politician (born 1960)

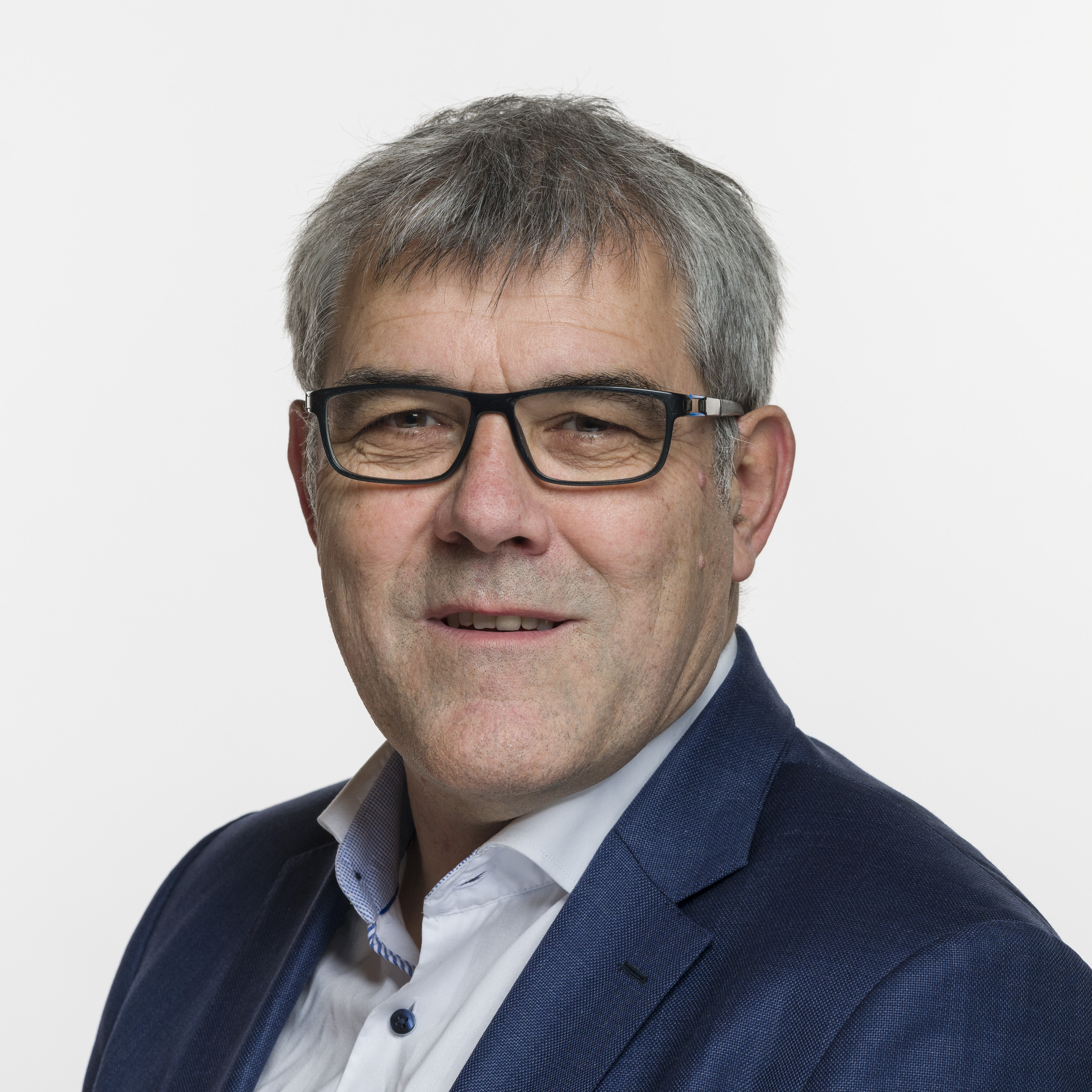
- Official portrait, 2019

President of the National Council
- In office 4 December 2023 – 2 December 2024
- Preceded by: Martin Candinas
- Succeeded by: Maja Riniker

Member of the National Council
- In office 3 December 2007 – 26 February 2026
- Constituency: Basel-Landschaft

Personal details
- Born: Eric Nussbaumer; 11 September 1960 (age 65) Mulhouse, France
- Party: Social Democratic Party of Switzerland
- Children: 3
- Education: University of Applied Sciences of Zurich

Eric Nussbaumer (born 11 September 1960 in Mulhouse) is a French-born Swiss politician who currently serves on the National Council (Switzerland) for the Social Democratic Party since 2007. He concurrently served as the President of the National Council from 2023 to 2024.

== Early life and education ==
Nussbaumer was born 11 September 1960 in Mulhouse, France, the second of three children, to Hans Nussbaumer, a farmer and estate manager, and Blanche Nussbaumer (née Nussbaumer; 1931–2014), into an Anabaptist Mennonite family of Swiss origin. His siblings are; Marc Nussbaumer and Evelyne Röthlisberger (née Nussbaumer).

His paternal and maternal family originally hailed from Lüterkofen in the Canton of Solothurn. They emigrated from Switzerland in the 1920s to manage the Ferme du Château de Pfastatt estate in Pfastatt. They were founding members of the Pfastatt Congregation of the Mennonite Church.

While the family retained dual Swiss and French citizenship, his parents decided to return to Switzerland, where Nussbaumer was raised in Effretikon and Brütten near Zurich. He studied electrical engineering at the University of Applied Sciences of Zurich (ZHAW).

== Professional career ==
Since 2010 he assumed as the president of the board of the ADEV. In 2015 he also assumed as the director of communication for the Swisspower AG, a cooperative of Swiss energy works. He is the President of the Board of Convivere, a real estate firm that bases its investments on christian values. He founded Convivere together with a fellow politician of the SP in 2020.

== Political career ==
He was a member of the municipal council and the Cantonal Council of Basel-Land from 1998 before he was elected into the National Council in 2007. He presided over the Cantonal Council of Basel-Land in the legislative year 2005–2006. He was a candidate to the Executive Council of Canton Baselland in 2007 and also in 2013. He achieved the best electoral result for the National Council in 2011 and 2019. In 2019 he was also a candidate for the Council of States where he came in third in the first round and then did not pursue an election in a second round.

After 18 years, He stepped down from his position on the National Council on the 26 of february 2026, with Social Democratic Party member Miriam Locher taking his place.

== Political positions ==
=== Foreign policy ===
Eric Nussbaumer supports an improvement of the relations with the European Union. He is the president of the European Movement Switzerland which demands from the Federal Council to begin negotiations over Switzerlands participation in the EU projects Horizon Europe, Erasmus+ and Digital Europe. He also defends the freedom of expression. He was elected the Vice-President of the National Council in 2022, which means he will assume its presidency in 2023.

=== Energy ===
As a member of the energy commission in the National Council, he was involved into the drafting of the energy strategy 2050. He supports renewable and sustainable energy sources and an independence from nuclear energy.

=== Football ===
He was the Captain of the FC Landrat, the football club of the Cantonal Council of Baselland and was also a member of the FC Nationalrat, the football club of the National Council. As a member of the FC Nationalrat, he was delighted when Marcel Dobler of the Liberals was elected into the National Council. On an other side he also sees the FC Nationalrat as supportive of finding alliances in national politics. He opposes the development of higher sums for transfers of football players, which apparently reminds him of a slave market.

== Personal life ==
Eric Nussbaumer is married and has three children. He was born in Mulhouse, France, has his place of origin in Lüterkofen, grew up in Zürich, and since 1988 Nussbaumer resides in Liestal, Baselland.
