= Joseph-Marie Timon-David =

The Reverend Joseph-Marie Timon-David SCJ
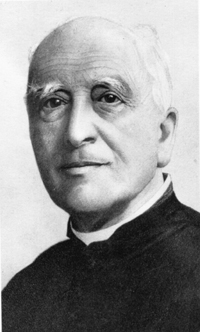
- Born: 29 January 1823; Marseille, France
- Died: 10 April 1891 (aged 68); Marseille, France
- Occupation: Priest
- Title: Father

Joseph-Marie Timon-David, SCJ (1823–1891) was a French Catholic priest and founder of the eponymous Timon David Fathers.

== Biography ==
=== Early life ===
Joseph-Marie Timon-David was born on 29 January 1823 in Marseille, into a wealthy and deeply Christian family, which had experienced the trials of the French Revolution. His father spent much of Joseph's youth abroad.

In 1833 his father died; then cholera struck Marseille. In 1835, his mother decided to send him to study at the Jesuit Collège Saint-Michel in Friborg, Switzerland. Friborg made a deep impression on him. There he met religious teachers in education and immersed himself in their educational methods. For him, Collège Saint Michel would be "the prototype of a house of education".

=== Priesthood ===
In 1842, Bishop Eugene de Mazenod sent Timon-David to Paris to the seminary of Saint Sulpice. At St. Sulpice Joseph would become an ultramontanist in reaction to the Gallicanism at the time. There he met Dom Guéranger, restorer of Solesmes Abbey, who would open to him the meaning and beauty of the liturgy.

Shortly before his ordination, providential meetings in Paris and Marseilles made him aware of the spiritual needs of the working class. He was ordained as a Roman Catholic priest in June 1846. His parishioners were mostly working-class youths. He observed that most of the young people had not received a basic religious training from their parents. Following the example of Alexande-Raymond Devie, Bishop of Belley, Timon-David sought to simplify religious education and often used biblical stories, insisting on "education through the heart". Timon-David devoted the next twenty-three years to the apostolate of young workers. Gradually, through painful and unsuccessful attempts, he decided to adopt the methods a priest of Marseille, Jean-Joseph Allemand, had applied to train the youth of the bourgeoisie.

As a way to offer amusements and draw the young workers away from dangerous activities, he established a young men's club, which sponsored a brass band, and put on theatricals. There was also a series of lectures on winter evenings on various topics, such as attendance at Mass. Timon-David strove to instill in the attendees solid virtues. His style was festive.

With his training in Freiburg and Saint Sulpice, on 1 November 1847, Timon-David opened, with the collaboration of Jean Joseph Allemand's Institute of Youth Work, "the work of the working class youth". Under the guidance of his spiritual advisor, Father John of the Sacred Heart, Timon-David gave it his personal stamp, calling it the "Work of the Sacred Heart". Devotion to the Sacred Heart would characterize Timon-David's life.

== Foundation of the Timon David Fathers ==
Seeing the quality and scope of what was being accomplished, Bishop Eugene de Mazenod urged Timon-David to found a religious congregation in the service of the work. On 20 November 1852, he founded the Timon David Fathers in Marseille. The bishop recognised both the work and the religious community, and gave them as patron the Sacred Heart of Jesus. The community would experience some difficult tests. It was not until 1859 that the community really began to exist. The work, meanwhile, continued to grow. In 1857, Bishop Mazenod named Timon-David a canon.

1859 was a pivotal year for Timon-David. The community took shape and stabilised. He and his method of direction of the works of youth began to be known. In France the concern to evangelize young workers fascinated many priests. Timon was pressed to publish an account of his methods. From that moment until the end of his life, many would come from all over France to observe his approach. Timon, while always giving priority to the young people of his house and to his community, would travel around France to explain his method; he would multiply his writings; he would always be the promoter of a Christian education that is not afraid to invite young people to go as far as possible on the path of holiness.

In 1864 he opened, annexed to the work, the School of the Sacred Heart to widen the educative influence of the work. Inspired by Saint Joseph Calasanz, whose biography he would write, he opened a new house in Marseille. However, the small community would face ten years of difficulties with Mazenod's successors. On 8 July 1876, recognition of the Congregation as a clerical Congregation of pontifical right put an end to all these trials.

=== Death ===
Timon continued all his work with his anti-revolutionary royalist ideas. He opened a house in Aix, and one in Béziers. The community grew little. When he died on April 10, 1891, in his native Marseille, he knew the work of his life would continue. Until the end, despite all the hassle and notoriety, he remained faithful to his vow of servitude to working class youth.

Avenue Timon-David located in the 13th arrondissement of Marseille is named after him.

== Writings ==
He was the author of a hagiography (biography) of St. Joseph Calasanctius (Marseille, 1883), and Method of direction of youth works: patronages, circles, schools, small seminars, etc. (1859-1875), 3rd ed. Marseille: Impr. E. Court-Payen, 1892.

== Schools of the Work ==
- School Establishment Notre Dame de la Viste - Marseille
- School Establishment Notre Dame de la Jeunesse - Marseille
- School Saint-Joseph - Aix-en-Provence
- School of the Sacred Heart (now LEP The Sacred Heart) - Béziers

== The early works Timon-David ==
- Marseille : Mother Work (founded in 1847); Work Nazareth (founded in 1925); Work Our Lady of Youth (founded in 2006); Work Saint Mauront [archive] (founded in 1904); Work St Calixte [archive] (founded in 1902); Work Our Lady of Youth (founded in 2007); Work Saint Louis de Gonzague-Endoume [archive] (founded in 1904). Work Our Lady of the Vist (founded in 1865).
- Béziers : Work of the Font Neuve (founded in 1885).
- Béziers: Former School of the Sacred Heart, since become LEP The Sacred Heart.
- Montpellier : Maisonnée Saint-Joseph, founded in 1907 and located in the district of Figuerolles, taken over by the community of Saint-Jean since 2009.
- Nîmes : Work Argaud (founded in 1837, until 2014).
- Rome : San Cirillo Alessandrino (founded in 1963 until 2013).
- Ajaccio : Work Saint Antoine (founded in 2008).
- A work was founded in Oran in 1905, but was closed at the end of the war in Algeria .

== Sources ==
- GCatholic - Founders of Religious Orders and Associations
- Catholic Encyclopaedia - St. Joseph Calasanctius
- the congregation's site, named after him
