= Pauker =

Pauker or Paucker (Russian: Паукер, Yiddish: poyker) is a surname of German origin. It may refer to:

- Alexander Paucker (1905–1972), Romanian composer
- Ana Pauker (1893–1960), Romanian politician
- Karl Pauker (1893–1937), Russian bodyguard
- K. V. Pauker (born 1944), Swedish writer
- Magnus Georg Paucker (1787–1855), German astronomer and mathematician
- Hermann von Paucker (1822-1889), Russian general and statesman
- Marcel Pauker (1896–1938), Romanian politician

== See also ==
- Simmering-Graz-Pauker, an Austrian manufacturer
