= Council of State of the Canton of Fribourg =

Cantonal government of Fribourg

- French: Conseil d'État du canton de Fribourg; German: Staatsrat des Kantons Freiburg
- Formation: 1848 (modern form)
- Headquarters: Hôtel cantonal, Fribourg, Switzerland
- Members: 7
- President: Jean-François Steiert (2025)
- Website: fr.ch/ce

The Council of State of the Canton of Fribourg is the executive organ of the government of the Canton of Fribourg in Switzerland. Comprising seven members, it is responsible for implementing laws passed by the Grand Council of Fribourg, managing the cantonal administration, and representing the canton in inter-cantonal and federal affairs.

The Council meets at the Chancellerie d’Etat in Fribourg and operates as a collegial body, with decisions made collectively and a presidency that rotates annually among its members. Members are elected by popular vote every five years, concurrently with elections to the Grand Council.

== Directorates ==
Each member of the government heads a directorate (a subdivision of the cantonal administration). Since 2002, the directorates have been named as follows:

- Directorate of Education and Cultural Affairs (French: Direction de la formation et des affaires culturelles, DFAC) (Note: 2002-2021 : Direction de l'instruction publique, de la culture et du sport ; 1982-2001 : Direction de l'instruction publique et des affaires culturelles ; 1977-1981 : Direction de l'instruction publique ; 1921-1975 : Direction de l'instruction publique et des archives ; 1957-1976 : Direction de l'instruction publique et des cultes)
- Directorate of Security, Justice, and Sport (French: Direction de la sécurité, de la justice et du sport, DSJS) (Note: 2002-2021 : Direction de la sécurité et de la justice ; 1982-2001 : Direction de la justice, de la police et des affaires militaires ; 1957-1981 : Direction de la justice, de la commune et des paroisses ; 1921-1956 : Direction de la justice, des cultes, des communes et des paroisses)
- Directorate of Institutions, Agriculture, and Forestry (French: Direction des institutions, de l'agriculture et des forêts, DIAF) (Note: 1982-2002 : Direction de l'intérieur et de l'agriculture ; 1967-1981 : Direction de l'intérieur, de l'agriculture, de l'industrie, du commerce et de l'artisanat ; 1957-1966 : Direction de l'intérieur, de l'agriculture, de l'industrie et du commerce ; 1921-1956 : Direction de l'intérieur, de l'agriculture et de la statistique)
- Directorate of Economy, Employment, and Vocational Training (French: Direction de l'économie, de l'emploi et de la formation professionnelle, DEEF) (Note: 2002-2021 : Direction de l'économie et de l'emploi ; 1982-2001 : Direction de l'économie, des transports et de l'énergie ; 1977-1981 : Direction de l'agriculture, de la police et des affaires militaires ; 1921-1976 : Département militaire, des forêts et des vignes)
- Directorate of Health and Social Affairs (French: Direction de la santé et des affaires sociales, DSAS) (Note: 1977-1981 : Direction de la santé publique et des affaires sociales ; 1967-1976 : Direction de la police et de la santé publique ; 1957-1966 : Direction de la police, de la santé publique et des affaires sociales ; 1921-1956 : Direction de la police, de la santé publique et du commerce)
- Directorate of Finances (French: Direction des finances, DFIN)
- Directorate of Territorial Development, Infrastructure, Mobility, and Environment (French: Direction du développement territorial, des infrastructures, de la mobilité et de l'environnement, DIME) (Note: 2002-2021 : Direction de l'aménagement, de l'environnement et des constructions ; 1921-2001 : Direction des travaux publics)

== Election ==
The members of the Council of State are elected every five years under a majority system with two rounds, with the first round held on the same day as the election of the Grand Council. From 1848 to 1921, the Council of State was elected by the Grand Council.

The president of the Council of State is elected by the Grand Council for a one-year term, non-renewable consecutively, based on the principle of seniority. (Note: A member of the Council of State can only accede to the presidency of the College after having sat under the presidency of all his colleagues.)

== History ==
From 1848 to 1874, the Council of State was exclusively composed of members of the Free Democratic Party, then almost exclusively of members of the Conservative Party (predecessor of the PDC). They were elected by the Grand Council and were generally drawn from its ranks.

Starting in 1921, the government was elected by the people and always included a member from a second party, but it was not until 1946 that its composition became pluralistic, though the conservative majority still persisted.

From 1981 onward, the government's composition finally began to reflect the electoral weight of the parties and could be described as pluralistic, with the two historical parties (PDC and PRD) each having to relinquish one seat. However, the majority remained with the bourgeois parties, and the PDC continued to be the dominant party.

Since the new cantonal constitution of 2004, members of the Council of State are limited to a maximum of three terms, and holding simultaneous office in the National Council or the Council of States is prohibited.

== Members ==
=== 2021–2026 Legislature ===
As of April 2025, the current members of the Council of State, elected for the 2021–2026 term, are:

- Jean-Pierre Siggen (The Centre)
- Olivier Curty (The Centre)
- Jean-François Steiert (Social Democratic Party) – President for 2025
- Didier Crottet (FDP.The Liberals)
- Sylvie Bonvin-Sansonnens (Social Democratic Party)
- Patrice Jordan (FDP.The Liberals)
- Romain Collaud (The Centre)

This list is based on the official announcement following the 7 November 2021 election, with a second round on 28 November 2021.

=== 2016–2021 Legislature ===
The previous legislature (2016–2021) included:

- Georges Godel (Christian Democratic People's Party)
- Maurice Ropraz (FDP.The Liberals)
- Jean-François Steiert (Social Democratic Party)
- Olivier Curty (Christian Democratic People's Party)
- Anne-Claude Demierre (Social Democratic Party)
- Didier Castella (FDP.The Liberals)
- Marie Garnier (Green Party)

Elections occurred on 6 November 2016, with a second round on 27 November 2016.

== See also ==
- Canton of Fribourg
- Grand Council of Fribourg
