= Gonzague de Reynold =

Swiss writer and historian (1880–1970)

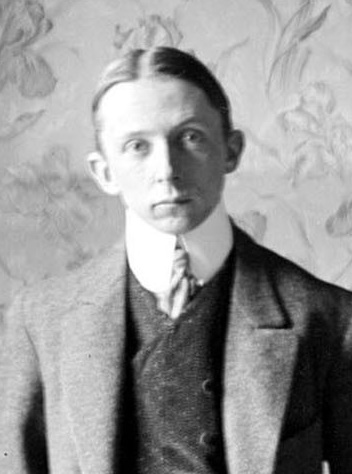
Gonzague de Reynold

Gonzague de Reynold (15 June 1880 – 9 April 1970) was a Swiss writer, historian, and right-wing political activist. Over the course of his six-decade career, he wrote more than thirty books outlining his traditionalist Catholic and Swiss nationalist worldview.

De Reynold won the Schiller Prize in 1955. With René de Weck and Léon Savary, he formed the troika of Fribourg writers of the early twentieth century.

== Life ==
A member of the minor Fribourgeois nobility, de Reynold was born at his family's sixteenth-century chateau in Cressier. He studied at Collège Saint-Michel, the Sorbonne, and the Institut Catholique de Paris before returning to Switzerland to teach philosophy and French literature at the University of Bern and the University of Fribourg. His work was part of the literature event in the art competition at the 1924 Summer Olympics.

Consistently "sceptical of liberal democracy and scathing about modernity in all its forms", de Reynold devoted his life to the promotion of Swiss nationalist and right-wing, traditionalist Catholic causes. In letters, he described longtime Portuguese dictator António de Oliveira Salazar as a friend and paid a personal visit to Benito Mussolini in 1933.

Although mostly active in Swiss affairs, in de Reynold's view his Fribourgeois, Swiss, Catholic, and European identities were inextricably linked, and he devoted two decades of his career to international affairs in service of this belief. He served as the Swiss delegate to and rapporteur of the International Committee on Intellectual Cooperation, a body of the League of Nations and precursor to UNESCO, from its inception in 1922 to its demise in 1939. Along with other prominent Catholics at the League, including Oskar Halecki and Secretaries-General Eric Drummond and Joseph Avenol, de Reynold used his position to promote the interests and values of the Holy See and the Catholic Church, in opposition to the more prevalent secular tendencies within the international organisation.

== Bibliography ==
- Histoire littéraire de la Suisse au XVIIIe siècle, Vols. I-II (Lausanne, 1909–1912).
- Contes et Légendes de la Suisse héroïque (Lausanne, 1913).
- Cités et pays suisses, Vols. I-III (Lausanne, 1914–1920).
- La Gloire qui chante (Lausanne, 1919).
- Charles Baudelaire (Geneva, 1920).
- La Suisse une et diverse (Fribourg, 1923).
- L'esprit genevois et la S.d.N. (Geneva, 1926).
- La démocratie et la Suisse : Essai d'une philosophie de notre histoire nationale (Bienne, 1934).
- L'Europe tragique: La Révolution moderne, La fin d'un monde (Paris, 1934).
- Le Génie de Berne et l'Âme de Fribourg (Lausanne, 1935).
- Conscience de la Suisse (Neuchâtel, 1938).
- Défense et Illustration de l'Esprit suisse (Neuchâtel, 1939).
- D'où vient l'Allemagne? (Paris, 1939).
- Grandeur de la Suisse (Neuchâtel, 1940).
- La Suisse de toujours et les Evénements d'aujourd'hui (Zurich, 1941).
- La Formation de l'Europe (1944–1957):
  - I. Qu'est-ce que l'Europe? (Fribourg, 1944).
  - II. Le Monde grec et sa Pensée (Fribourg, 1944).
  - III. L'Hellénisme et le Génie européen (Fribourg, 1944).
  - IV. L'Empire romain (Fribourg, 1945).
  - V. Le Monde barbare: Les Celtes (Paris, 1949).
  - VI. Le Monde barbare: Les Germains (Paris, 1953).
  - VII. Le Monde russe (Paris, 1950).
  - VIII. Le Toit chrétien (Paris, 1957).
- Impressions d'Amérique (Lausanne, 1950).
- Fribourg et le Monde (Neuchâtel, 1957).
- Mes mémoires, Vols. I-III (Geneva, 1960–1963).
- Synthèse du xviie siècle, La France classique et l'Europe baroque (Paris, 1962).
- Gonzague de Reynold raconte la Suisse et son Histoire (Paris, 1965).
- Destin du Jura (Lausanne, 1967).
- Expérience de la Suisse (Fribourg, 1970).
