= University of Fribourg =

University in the city of Fribourg, Switzerland

- Université de Fribourg; Universität Freiburg
- Latin: Universitas Friburgensis
- Motto: Scientia et Sapientia ("Knowledge and Wisdom")
- Type: Public
- Established: 1582/1763; 263 years ago, 1889; 137 years ago
- Affiliations: BeNeFri; Compostela Group of Universities
- Rector: Katharina Fromm
- Administrative staff: academic 1150, admin 750
- Students: 10,000
- Location: Fribourg, Canton of Fribourg, Switzerland; 46.80625°N 7.15174°E
- Campus: University town
- Website: www.unifr.ch

The University of Fribourg is a public university located in Fribourg, Switzerland.

The roots of the university can be traced back to 1580, when the notable Jesuit Peter Canisius founded the Collège Saint-Michel in Fribourg. In 1763, an academy of law was founded by the state of Fribourg which formed the nucleus of the present law faculty. The University of Fribourg was finally created in 1889 by an Act of the parliament of the Swiss Canton of Fribourg.

The University of Fribourg is Switzerland's only bilingual university and offers full curricula in both French and German, two of Switzerland's national languages. Students number about 10,000; there are about 200 tenured professors and 700 other academic teaching and research personnel. The Misericorde Campus, constructed between 1939 and 1942, was designed by the architects Honegger and Dumas, students of Swiss architect Le Corbusier.

There are five faculties: Catholic theology, law, natural sciences, humanities, and economics and social sciences.

== History ==
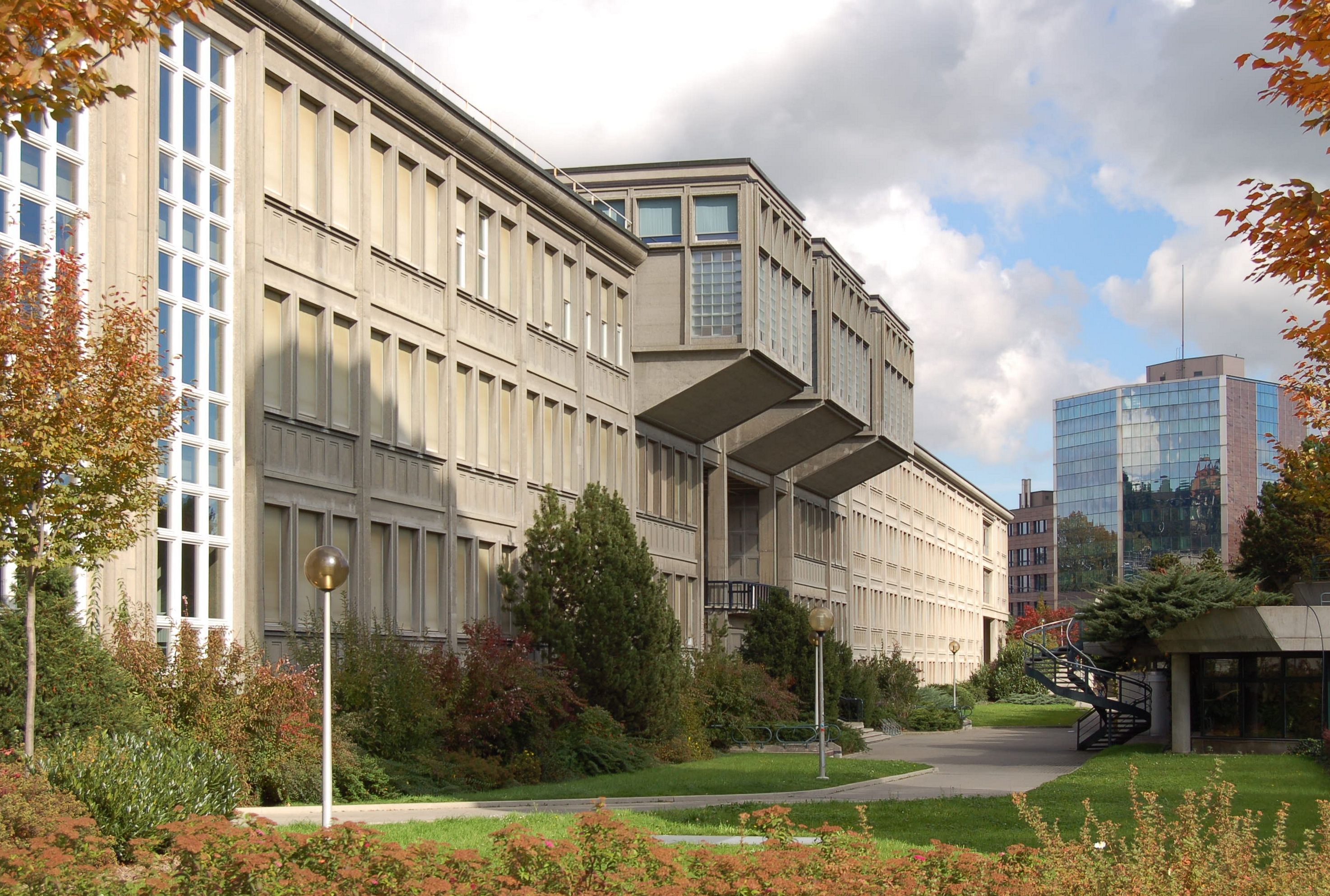
University of Fribourg, main building

The university owes its earliest origin to the foundation of the Jesuit College St. Michel on Belze Hill by Peter Canisius in 1580 at the invitation of the government of Fribourg. In 1763, an Academy of Law was founded, housed in the Albertinium (now a Dominican residence). In 1834, the cantonal library was formed from works brought to Fribourg (from Catholic monasteries) for safekeeping. The College St. Michel was closed following the expulsion of the Jesuits from Fribourg after the canton's defeat in the Sonderbund war.

In 1886, Georges Python, founder of the cantonal bank and State Counsellor for Fribourg (M.P. in the upper house of the Swiss parliament) became Director of Public Education. He raised funds through a lottery and was granted some 2,500,000 CHF by the canton. The cantonal library became integrated with that of the university and the academy became the Faculty of Law. In 1939, the university moved to a new campus constructed on the former cemetery of Misericorde, ceding St. Michel to one of Fribourg's gymnasia, which took the name College St. Michel. During the Second World War, the university set up "university camps" along with the University of Zürich, Handels-Hochschule in St. Gallen and a Lycée camp at Wetzikon provided a wide variety of courses to educate Polish prisoners of war.

The Perolles campus was constructed on the site of a former wagon factory.

Although many lectures were originally in Latin, Fribourg is now the only French/German bilingual university in the world (45% French and 55% German). The town itself is 70% French and 30% German. This fact, coupled with the traditional dominance of French as the language of the city aristocracy explains why French has remained so dominant in university administration and in the AGEF (Association Générale des Etudiants Fribourgois), the Student's Union. To commemorate the centenary of the university, La Poste issued a stamp depicting the figures Science and Sagesse.

== Recent developments ==
University rankings

Global – Overall
- ARWU World: 501–600 (2023)
- QS World: 642 (2026)
- THE World: 401–500 (2024)
- USNWR Global: =537 (2023)

In 2005, the university inaugurated its Perolles 2 campus, to which the Faculty of Economics and Social Science relocated. The university has the third largest collection of Biblical antiquities in the world after the British Museum and the Cairo Museum. Fribourg has also developed FriMat, a centre of excellence in nanotechnology. As part of the BeNeFri association comprising the Universities of Berne, Neuchâtel and Fribourg, students at any one of these universities may take courses at another in the association and still receive credit at their home institution. The academic degrees were the Demi-Licence, Licence, DEA / DESS, Doctorate. The university now follows the requirements of the Bologna process.

The University of Fribourg launched for the 2009–2010 academic year a new postgraduate law programme, the Master of Laws in Cross-Cultural Business Practice (MLCBP), an LL.M taught entirely in English.

== Campuses ==
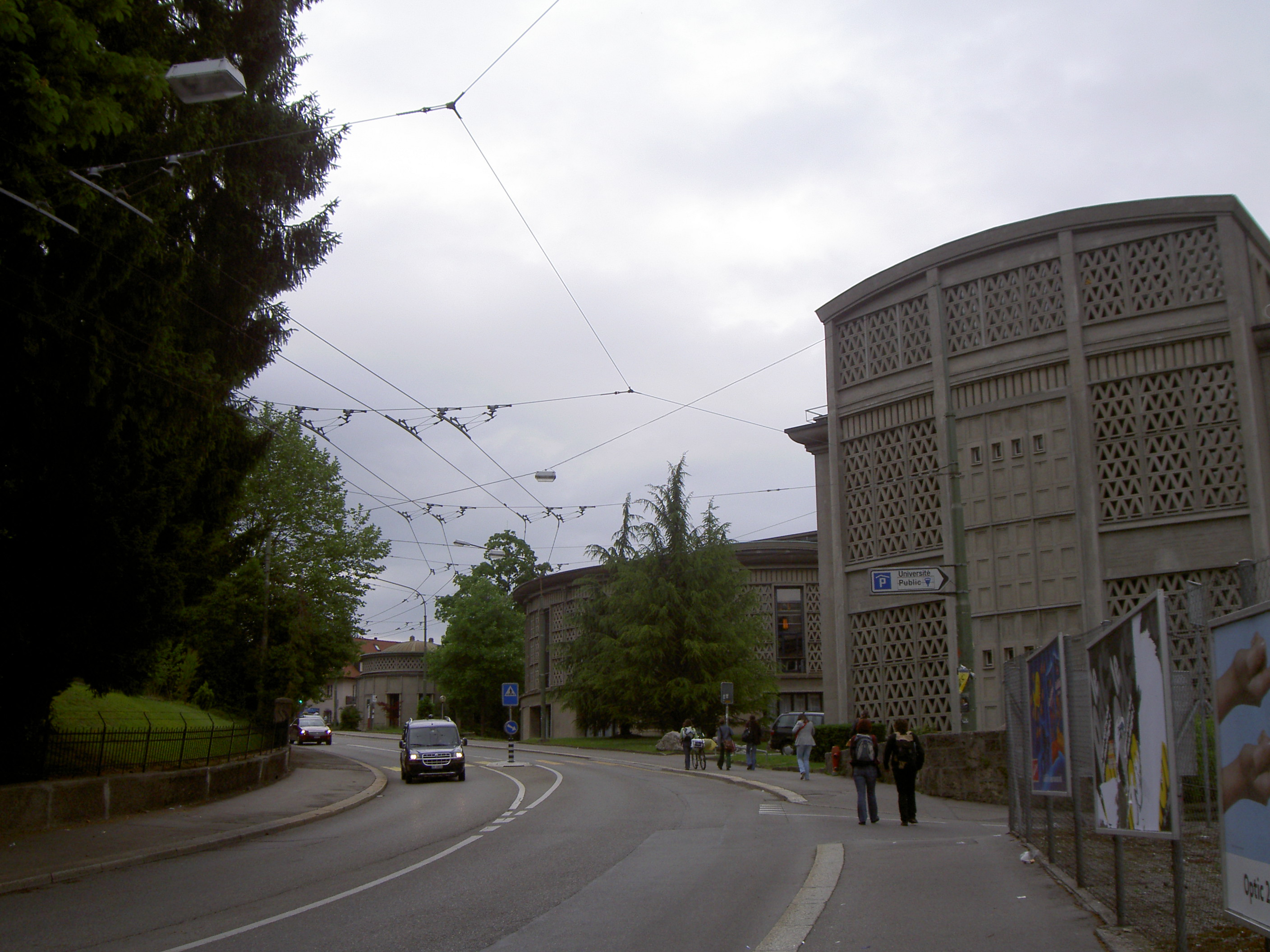
Entrance, Avenue de l'Europe

Fribourg has no central campus and its buildings are located throughout the city. The main sites are:

- Misericorde - Humanities and central administration (including the famous Senate room)
- Perolles - Science
- Perolles 2 - Economics & Social Sciences
- Regina Mundi - Psychology
- BCU centrale - Main Library (Cantonal and University Library of Fribourg)
- Pierre Aeby - Department of Classical Philology
- Bonnesfontaines - Pedagogy
- Stade St. Leonard - University Stadium

== Faculties ==
The Fribourg University is divided into six faculties:

- The Faculty of Humanities is the largest faculty with about 4,600 students. They follow courses and seminars in the fields of philosophy, historical sciences, languages, literature, education, psychology or social sciences.
- The Faculty of Law has about 1,900 students. The program includes national and international law; both subjects areas can be followed bilingual.
- The Faculty of Theology is the largest and the most international of Switzerland, and, with Lucerne, it is the only state university in Switzerland to have a Faculty of Catholic Theology.
- Approximately 1,400 students are enrolled in one of the four Bachelor programmes and one of the seven Master programmes of the Faculty of Management, Economics and Social Sciences. The faculty is composed of four departments: business management, economics, computer science, media and communication. In addition, the international institute of management in technology (iimt) and the Verbandsmanagement Institute (VMI) are attached to the Faculty.
- The Faculty of Science and Medicine was founded in 1896 and comprises seven departments: biology, chemistry, geosciences, computer science, mathematics, medicine and physics. These cover 14 fields: biochemistry, biology, chemistry, geography, computer science, human medicine and dentistry (Bachelor), mathematics, neuroscience, pharmacy, physics, biomedical sciences, environmental sciences, earth sciences (geology) and sport. The Adolphe Merkle Institute (AMI) is an interdisciplinary research institute of the Faculty of Sciences devoted to fundamental and application-oriented research and teaching in the domain of soft nanomaterials.
- The Faculty of Education was formed on august first 2025 through the merger with the Haute école pédagogique of Fribourg. The faculty awards teaching degrees ranging from elementary school to post-compulsory education.

== Traditions ==
- Dies Academicus - On this day in November every year, no lectures are held. Festivities begin with Mass in the Chapel of the Collège St. Michel. The members of the university then proceed to the Aula Magna (Great Hall) in solemn procession. After an address by the rector and a prominent guest speaker, honorary degrees are awarded. The student guilds attend in ceremonial dress including swords.
- Corporations - These are similar to the Studentenverbindungen in Germany and Austria, but there is no de facto constraint to participate as it is in the student nations at the universities of Uppsala, Lund and Helsinki. They maintain Central European student traditions and meet at least once a week around a Stammtisch ("regulars' table") in order to socialise, drink and sing together. They tend to be organised on linguistic lines. One of them is still engaged in dueling, while the other corporations in Fribourg already rejected this tradition at the time they were founded, amongst others for religious reasons. Membership has often been considered advantageous for those wishing to pursue a career in business, politics or law. Most of Fribourg's student corporations belong to the formerly Catholic Schweizerischer Studentenverein. An example is AV Fryburgia.
- The Day of Welcomes (Jour D'Accueil) - Similar to Freshers' Week in anglophone universities. New students are invited to the Aula Magna, where they are welcomed to Fribourg by the Rector and the Syndic (Mayor of the City of Fribourg). This is followed by a meal in the university mensa provided by the city, where new students are expected to dine with the rest of the faculty to which they have been admitted.
- Every year, the Catholic Church holds collections during masses throughout Switzerland. Known as Fribourg Sunday, the funds raised are mainly used to award scholarships to foreign priests by the Faculty of Theology.

== Branding ==
The university seal depicts a cross and bishop's ring representing the university's Catholic ethos on a shield of black and white, representing the canton of Fribourg. The logo of the university is a blue stylized "F" (with triangles echoing the facade structure of the Miséricorde Building and symbolizing the Alps) and the name of the university in Latin.

== Notable alumni and faculty ==
=== Writers and academics ===
- Patrick Aebischer, former president of the École Polytechnique Fédérale de Lausanne
- Pietro Balestra, Swiss economist specialized in econometrics
- Hans Wolfgang Brachinger, German mathematician and econometrician
- Mary Daly, feminist theologian and advocate of parthenogenesis
- Reiner Eichenberger, Chair of the Center for Public Finance at the University of Fribourg
- Lionel Groulx (1878–1967), Québécois priest and historian
- Vincas Mykolaitis, Lithuanian poet and writer
- Jerome Murphy-O'Connor, Professor of New Testament at the Ecole Biblique in Jerusalem
- Hugo Obermaier, prehistorian and anthropologist
- Kazys Pakštas, geographer, founder of Lithuanian Geographical Society
- Michel Plancherel, mathematician
- Eleanor Purdie (1872–1929), philologist; first woman to obtain a doctorate from the University of Fribourg
- Gonzague de Reynold, writer and academic, author of Cités et pays suisse
- Léon Savary, writer and journalist
- Csaba Szabo, pharmacologist
- Wilhelm Schmidt, Austrian linguist, anthropologist, and ethnologist
- Winfried Sebald, German writer
- Peter Thullen, mathematician
- Peter Trudgill, British sociolinguist and dialectologist
- Werner Ulrich, Swiss social scientist and practical philosopher, one of the originators of "critical systems thinking" (CST)
- Eliseo Verón, sociologist
- Luc E. Weber, Rector Emeritus of the University of Geneva
- Jean Zermatten, academic and Chair of U.N. Commission on the Rights of the Child
- Maurice Zermatten, writer, winner of the Schiller International Prize
- Roselyne Crausaz, Swiss politician

=== Clergy ===
- Gilberto Agustoni, Prefect Emeritus of the Supreme Tribunal of the Apostolic Signature
- Michael Browne O.P., Master General of the Order of Preachers
- Georges Cottier, official theologian to the Papal Household (under John Paul II), Secretary of the International Theological Commission
- Clemens August Graf von Galen
- Bernard Genoud, Bishop of Geneva, Lausanne and Fribourg
- Basil Hume, former archbishop of Westminster
- Franciszek Macharski, former archbishop of Kraków
- Rupert Mayer Blessed, Jesuit critic of the Nationalist Socialist Regime
- Peter Hildebrand Meienberg, East African missionary.
- Gaspard Mermillod, attended the Jesuit Seminary that was the forerunner of the university; Cardinal Beer takes its name from him
- Aloisius Joseph Muench, Bishop of Fargo, North Dakota
- Raymond Roussin, former Archbishop of Vancouver
- Christoph Schönborn, Archbishop of Vienna
- Henri Schwery, Bishop of Sion
- Angelo Scola, Patriarch of Venice
- Prince Max von Sachsen, Bishop, Prince of Saxony and son of King George of Saxony and Donna Maria Anna, the Infanta of Portugal
- Dom Henry Wansbrough OSB
- Albert Ziegler SJ, Swiss theologian, ethicist and author
- Anton Rohner ON, Swiss clergy, philosopher and professor

=== Politics ===
- Elijah Malok Aleng, former Deputy Governor of the Central Bank of Sudan and President of the Bank of Southern Sudan (2005–2011)
- Gerard Batliner, former Head of Government (Regierungschef) of Liechtenstein (1962–1970)
- Joseph Bech, Luxembourgish politician and 15th prime minister of Luxembourg
- Juan Carlos I, King of Spain
- Corina Casanova, Federal Chancellor of Switzerland 2008–2015
- Enrico Celio, President of the Swiss Confederation 1943, 1948
- Flavio Cotti, President of the Swiss Confederation 1991, 1998
- Joseph Deiss, Federal Chancellor 1999–2006, President of the Swiss Confederation 2004, President of the United Nations General Assembly 2010–11
- Kurt Furgler, President of the Swiss Confederation 1977, 1981 and 1985
- Martine Brunschwig Graf, Swiss politician, member of the Swiss National Council
- Otmar Hasler, Prime Minister of Liechtenstein 2001–09
- Hans Hürlimann, President of the Swiss Confederation 1979
- Arnold Koller, President of the Swiss Confederation 1990, 1997
- Giuseppe Lepori, Federal Chancellor and Consigliere del popolo (M.P.) for Ticino
- Richard Thomas McCormack, US Ambassador to the Organization of American States 1985–1989, US Under Secretary of State for Economic and Agricultural Affairs 1989–1991
- Ruth Metzler, Federal Chancellor, Member of the Swiss Federal Council 1999–2003, Vice President of the Swiss Confederation 2003
- Stanisław Mieroszewski, member of the Imperial Council of Austria
- Juli Minoves, Andorran ambassador, plenipotentiary, and political scientist
- Ignacy Mościcki, President of Poland 1926–1939
- Giuseppe Motta, Federal Chancellor (Swiss Cabinet member) 1911–40 (President of the Swiss Confederation 1915, '20, '27, '32, '37), President of the League of Nations 1924–25
- Jean-Marie Musy, Federal Chancellor, Member of the Swiss Federal Council
- Albert Pintat, head of the government of Andorra
- Bill Press, U.S. political commentator and former chairman of the Democratic Party of California
- Judith Schmutz, Swiss politician, president of the Lucerne Cantonal Council 2023–2024
- Simonetta Sommaruga, Member of the Swiss Federal Council 2010–present, President of the Swiss Confederation 2015
- Ludwig von Moos, President of the Swiss Confederation 1964, 1969
- Chaim Weizmann, first President of Israel
- Sérgio Vieira de Mello, UN High Commissioner for Human Rights 2002-2003 and UN Special Representative for Iraq 2003

=== Business and economics ===
- Jean-Marie Ayer co-founder of Dartfish, chairman and CEO 1999–2003
- Albert M. Baehny, Chief Executive Officer (CEO) of the Geberit Group since January 1, 2005
- Urs Felber, Swiss industrialist, philanthropist and design pioneer
- Stephan Klapproth, Swiss journalist and television presenter
- Adolphe Merkle, founder of Vibro-Meter International AG, Adolphe Merkle Foundation
- Marc Moret, former chairman of Sandoz, uncle of Daniel Vasella's wife
- Klaus Martin Schwab, German economist, the founder and executive chairman of the World Economic Forum
- Arthur Dunkel (1932–2005), Swiss (Portuguese-born) administrator and a professor at the University of Fribourg; director-general of General Agreement on Tariffs and Trade, 1980–1993

=== Sports ===
- René Fasel, president of the International Ice Hockey Federation
- Gianni Infantino, current FIFA president

=== Architecture ===
- Mario Botta, founder of the Academy of Architecture at Mendrisio (Honoris Causa)

=== Judiciary ===
- Giusep Nay, president of the Federal Supreme Court of Switzerland 2005–2006, 1988–2006
- Alois Pfister, member of the Federal Supreme Court of Switzerland
- Antonin Gregory Scalia, U.S. Justice
- Luzius Wildhaber, Swiss judge; first president of the European Court of Human Rights

=== Royalty ===
- Karl Friedrich, Prince of Hohenzollern, head of the Swabian House of Hohenzollern

=== Military ===
- Daniel Anrig, 34th Commandant of the Pontifical Swiss Guard

== Gallery ==
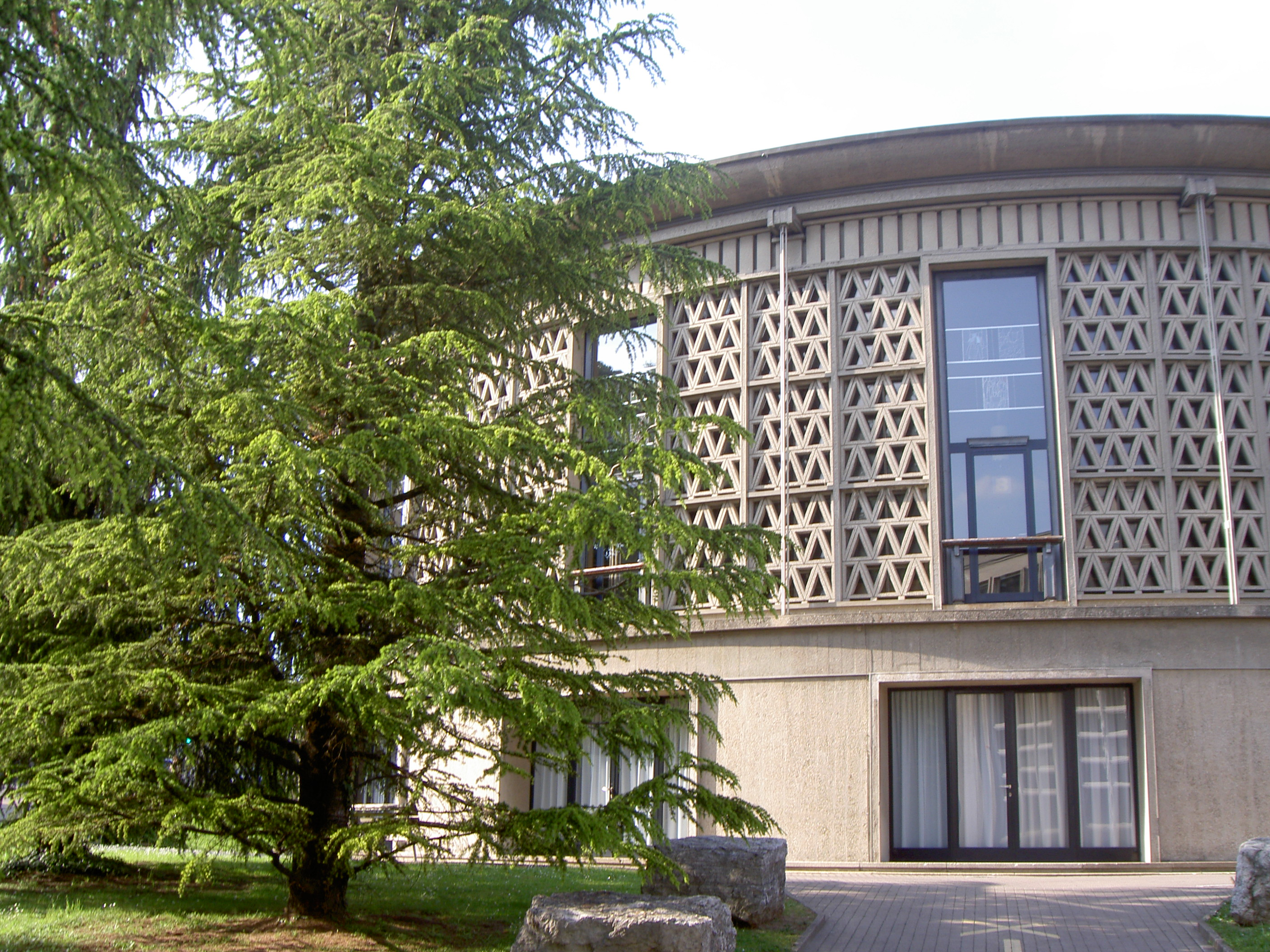
Aula Magna (Great Hall)

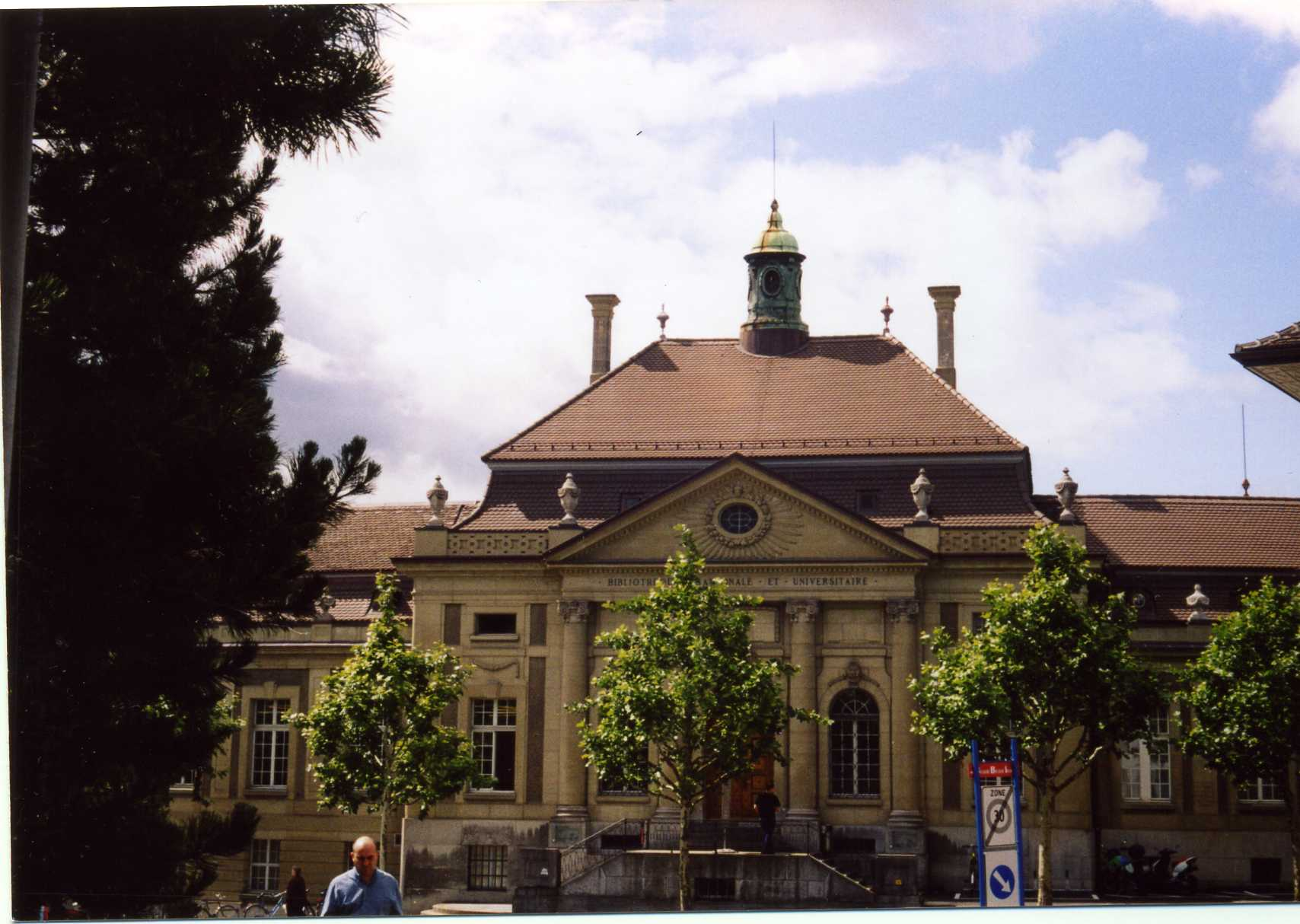
BCU, University of Fribourg

Pavilion of Musicology

== See also ==
- List of largest universities by enrollment in Switzerland
- List of modern universities in Europe (1801–1945)
- List of universities in Switzerland
- Education in Switzerland
- Bible and Orient Museum
- Science and technology in Switzerland
- List of colleges and universities by country
- List of colleges and universities
