= Jane Connors (academic) =

Australian academic and lawyer

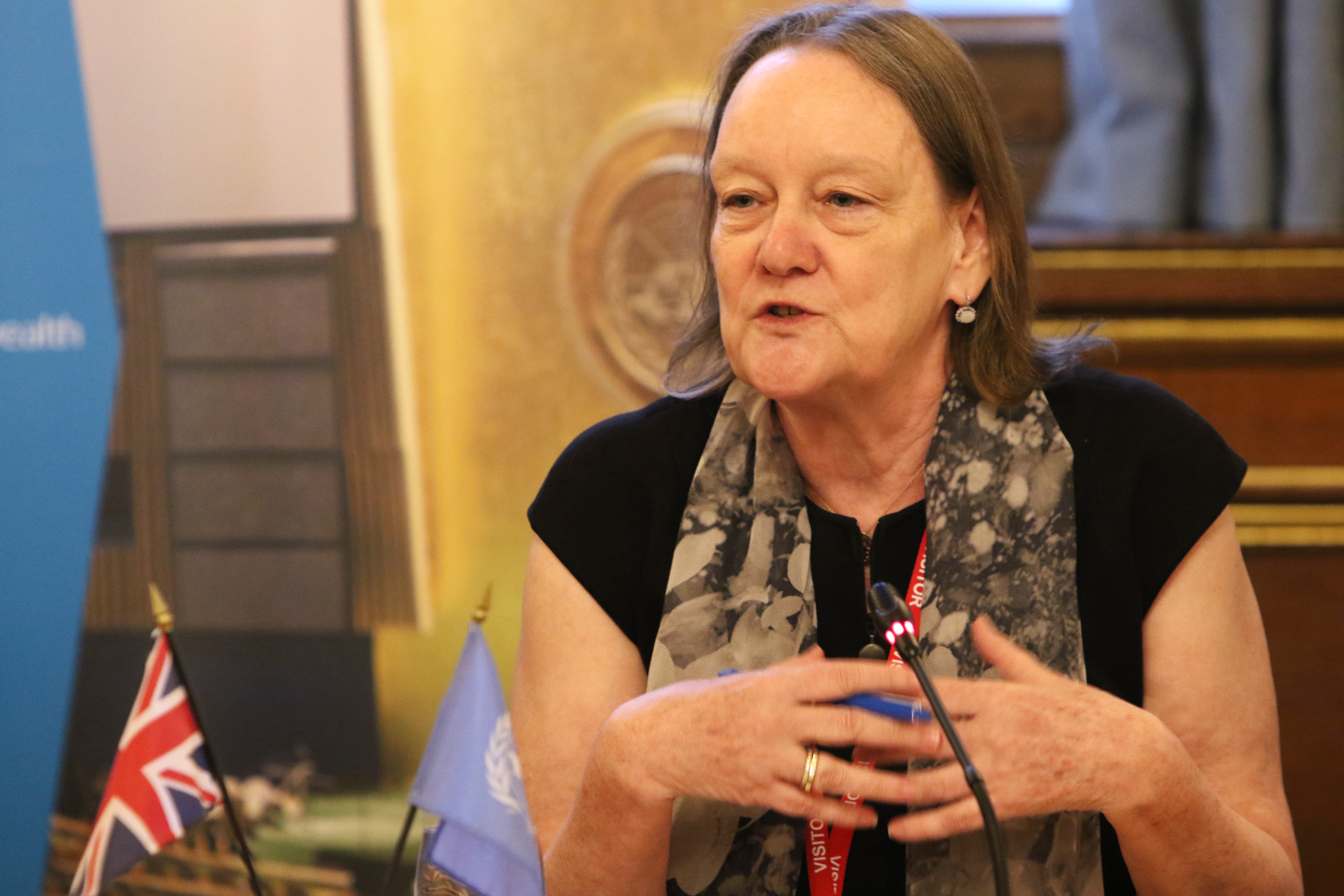
- Born: Jane Frances Connors; 1953 (age 72–73); Sydney, New South Wales, Australia
- Education: Australian National University
- Occupations: Academic, lawyer
- Employer: Amnesty International
- Known for: Director of International Advocacy at Amnesty International; United Nations Victims' Rights Advocate
- Title: Victims' Rights Advocate

Jane Frances Connors (born 1953) is an Australian academic and lawyer who served as Director of International Advocacy at Amnesty International. She is a visiting professor in practice at the London School of Economics and Political Science’s Centre for Women, Peace and Security and has taught in several other universities including University of Canberra and the Australian National University in Australia.

== Background and career ==
Connors was born in Sydney, New South Wales, Australia and was the first of eight children. Her father, John was a surgeon and her mother, Patricia was a nurse. She was educated at St Benedict's Primary School, Narrabundah, Canberra and at St Clare's College, Griffith before studying Law and Arts at the Australian National University in Canberra. After graduation, she taught Law at the Canberra College of Advanced Education (renamed University of Canberra) before moving to England, United Kingdom where she taught at the Universities of Nottingham in 1982 and Lancaster in 1983, and later transferred to University of London's School of Oriental and African Studies.

Connors worked for Amnesty International in Geneva prior to her appointment to the role of Victims' Rights Advocate for the United Nations in 2017.
