= Timon David Fathers =

- Congregation of the Sacred Heart of Jesus
- Latin: Congregatio Sacratissimi Cordis Iesu
- Abbreviation: SCJ
- Nickname: Timon David Fathers
- Formation: November 20, 1852 (173 years ago)
- Founder: Joseph-Marie Timon-David
- Founded at: France
- Type: Clerical religious congregation of pontifical right (for men)
- Headquarters: Marseille, France
- Members: 22 (20 priests) (2018)
- Superior General: Michel Brondino, SCJ
- Parent organization: Roman Catholic Church
- Website: timon-david.org

The Timon David Fathers, officially known as the Congregation of the Sacred Heart of Jesus (French: Congrégation du Sacré-Coeur de Jésus; Latin: Congregatio Sacratissimi Cordis Iesu; abbreviated SCJ) is a Roman Catholic religious congregation of pontifical right. It was founded in 1852 by Joseph-Marie Timon-David.

== History ==
Joseph-Marie Timon-David was a priest of Marseilles, concerned with the well-being of young workers. He observed that most of the young people had not received a basic religious training from their parents. He worked for some time with the Youth Movements of Abbé Julien, and then with Father Allemand who worked with the lower middle class. In 1849, Bishop Eugène de Mazenod encouraged him to establish his own movement.

Following the example of Alexande-Raymond Devie, Bishop of Belley, Timon-David sought to simplify religious education and often used biblical stories, insisting on "education through the heart".
