= Grand Council of Fribourg =

The largest individual party in the Grand Council as of 2022 is The Centre. The Liberal-Radicals and Green-Liberals sit together as a single bloc, as do the Greens and the Christian Social Party.

The Grand Council of Fribourg (French: Grand Conseil de Fribourg) is the legislature of the canton of Fribourg, in Switzerland. Fribourg has a unicameral legislature. The Grand Council has 110 seats, with members elected every four years.

Summary of the 7 November 2021 Fribourg parliamentary election results
Party	Ideology	Votes	%	Seats	Seats ±
The Centre (DM/CP)	Christian democracy	261,921	22.08	26	–1
LRP.The Liberal-Radicals (PLR/FDP)	Classical liberalism	238,848	20.14	23	+2
Socialist Party (PS/SP)	Social democracy	222,389	18.75	21	–7
Democratic Union of the Centre (UDC/SVP)	National conservatism	205,036	17.29	18	–3
Federal Democratic Union (EDU/UDF)	Christian right	205,036	17.29	1	+1
Greens (GPS/PES)	Green politics	141,866	11.96	13	+7
Green Liberal Party (GLP/PVL)	Green liberalism	49,557	4.18	3	+2
Christian Social Party (CSP/PCS)	Christian left	49,333	4.16	4	±0
Others	N/A	17,088	1.44	1 (Note: Taken by La Broye c'est Vous)	–1
Total (turnout 37.83%)		1,186,038	100	110	–
Source: Canton of Fribourg
