= Groupe de Saint-Luc =

Swiss Catholic art movement (1919–1945)

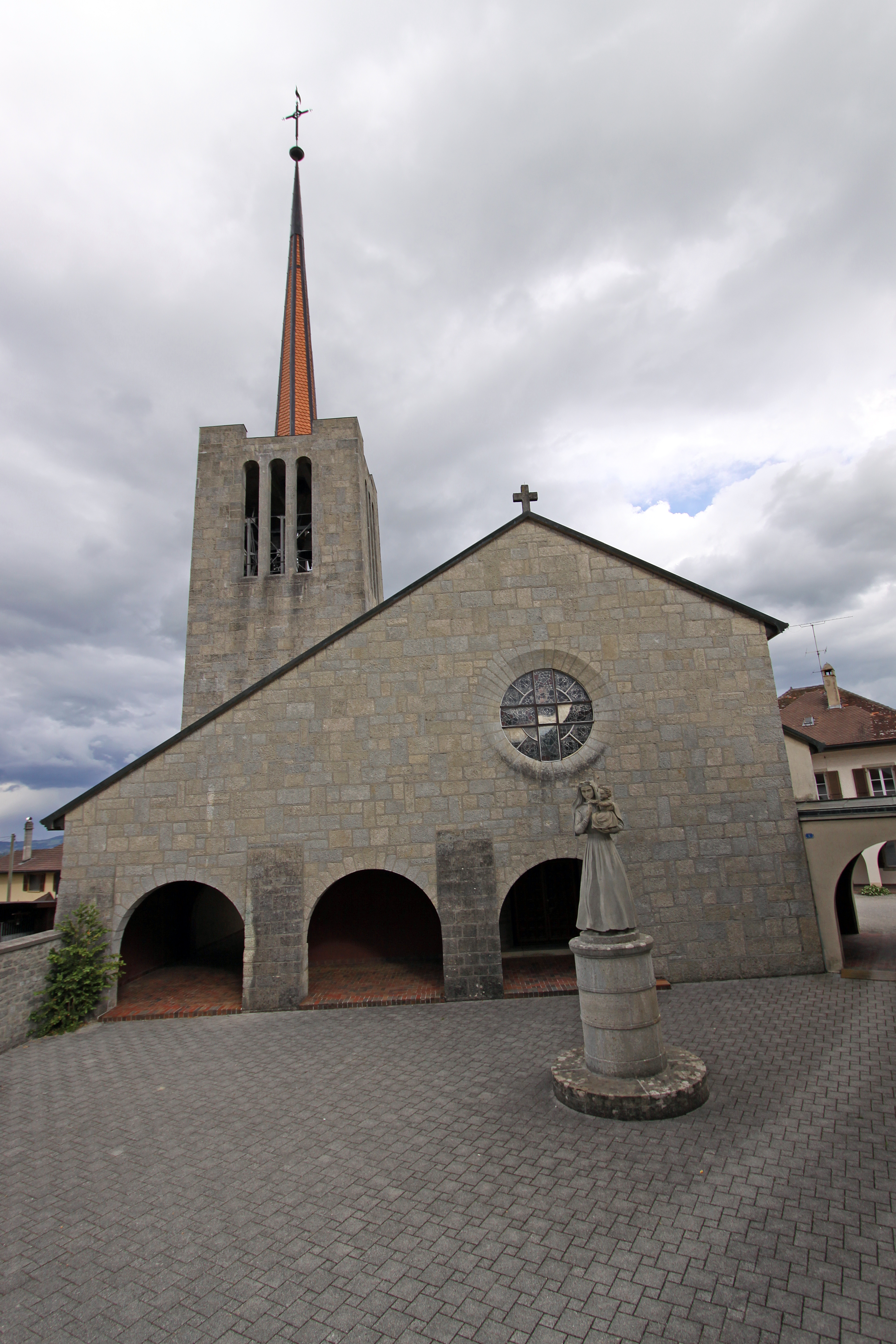
- Church of Saint-Maurice in Bussy, built and decorated in 1937–1938 by artists linked to the Groupe de Saint-Luc, with architecture by Fernand Dumas
- Years active: 1919–1945
- Location: Romandy
- Major figures: Alexandre Cingria; Marcel Poncet; Fernand Dumas

Groupe de Saint-Luc is the name commonly given to the expression in Romandy, the French-speaking part of Switzerland, of an artistic and cultural phenomenon that marked Switzerland in the interwar period. It originated in the Groupe de Saint-Luc et Saint-Maurice, a cooperative founded in Geneva in 1919 to provide work for the decoration of churches. In 1924 the society was reconstituted as the Societas Sancti Lucae (SSL), a national association of Swiss Catholic artists and art lovers. In 1932 the SSL split into a German-Swiss group and the Groupe romand de Saint-Luc. The Groupe de Saint-Luc became famous for the dozens of churches and chapels that its members built, renovated, and decorated in Romandy.

== History ==
=== Groupe de Saint-Luc et Saint-Maurice ===
The Groupe de Saint-Luc originated in a cooperative society founded in Geneva in 1919 by Alexandre Cingria, brother of Charles-Albert Cingria, and Marcel Poncet: the Groupe de Saint-Luc et Saint-Maurice (1919–1924). Like many artists' guilds and confraternities since the Middle Ages, the group chose as its patron Saint Luke, traditionally regarded as the patron saint of artists because he is said to have painted a portrait of the Virgin Mary. Saint Maurice, a Christian of the Theban Legion in whose honor Saint Sigismund founded the monastery of Agaune (the Abbey of Saint-Maurice) in 515, is said to have been chosen for the Latin values he embodies.

The Groupe de Saint-Luc et Saint-Maurice aimed to offer work in various techniques (mural painting, sculpture, stained glass, goldsmithing, mosaic, and textile arts) for the decoration of churches. To this end it secured the collaboration of a handful of artists in these fields, such as the goldsmith Marcel Feuillat, the sculptor François Baud, the painter, mosaicist, and embroiderer Marguerite Naville, and the painters Georges de Traz and Théophile Robert. Deploring that parishes too often turned to firms selling industrially produced devotional articles with no artistic ambition, the group offered an alternative to this "decadence of sacred art", which Alexandre Cingria had theorized in his 1917 book of that name (La décadence de l'art sacré). The cooperative was short-lived. It did not achieve the commercial success it had hoped for and went bankrupt in early 1924.

=== Societas Sancti Lucae ===
The society was reconstituted in a new form in the summer of the same year, after some artists from the original core of the Groupe de Saint-Luc et Saint-Maurice met figures from German-speaking Switzerland who shared their wish to renew sacred art, among them Hans von Matt, Linus Birchler, Alois Süss, Arnold Stockmann, Augustin Meinrad Bächtiger, and Johannes Scheier. In October 1924 they together founded the Societas Sancti Lucae (SSL), in German St. Lukasgesellschaft and in French Société de Saint-Luc. It defined itself as an association of Swiss Catholic artists and art lovers whose mission was to develop and promote contemporary Christian art. Unlike the Groupe de Saint-Luc et Saint-Maurice, it brought together, besides artists, representatives of the Catholic clergy and "friends of art": Catholic intellectuals (notably Gonzague de Reynold), politicians, and citizens who extended the group's reach. National in scope and with hundreds of members, the society organized exhibitions, meetings, and lectures, and from 1927 it published its own yearbook, Ars sacra. It embodied a militant and conquering Catholicism, which found expression in the construction of an impressive number of new places of worship in Switzerland between the wars and in intense activity and visibility in art and culture.

=== Groupe romand de Saint-Luc ===
In 1932 the SSL split into two regional groups, the SSL/Gruppe deutsche Schweiz and the Groupe romand de Saint-Luc. The split was initiated by the members from Romandy, who cited aesthetic differences and a Latin character they considered incompatible with Germanic culture (the image of a divide dating back to World War I, the Röstigraben). Their statements show stereotyped categorizations that associated the art of German-speaking Switzerland with a certain coldness and sobriety (equated with Protestant "austerity" and with Neues Bauen), whereas the art of Romandy, which gave pride of place to the decorative arts, was associated with warmth and richness through its abundance of color. The two groups continued their activities separately, still under the umbrella of the SSL, until the mid-1940s, while the Groupe romand gradually faded away. The SSL itself continued to exist into the 21st century.

According to a list published in 1936, the Groupe romand de Saint-Luc had 146 members, five of them from Ticino, including Federal Councillor Giuseppe Motta and the painters Emilio Maria Beretta (husband of Isabelle Cingria, Alexandre Cingria's daughter) and Aldo Crivelli. According to the list, only 12 women had joined the Groupe romand by 1936, among them Marguerite Naville, mentioned above; the painter, illustrator, and embroiderer Alice Basset; and Marie-Gabrielle Berthier, who began her career as a painter on ceramics and produced many altar vases, missal pictures, statuettes, and embroideries for liturgical vestments. The Groupe romand published a yearbook in 1936 (Annuaire romand de St-Luc) and an almanac in 1937 (Almanach romand de St-Luc), and from 1937 monographs in the series L'art religieux en Suisse romande.

=== Churches ===
The Groupe de Saint-Luc became famous for the dozens of churches and chapels that its members built, renovated, and decorated in Romandy. The architect Fernand Dumas was one of its most emblematic representatives. His buildings combined traditional and modern forms in a characteristic way and gave a major role to decoration, which he entrusted to many artists: besides those already mentioned, the Tuscan Gino Severini and the painters Willy Jordan, Gaston Thévoz, Albert Gaeng, Paul Monnier, and Paul Landry.

== Bibliography ==
- F. Brentini, Im Dienste der modernen kirchlichen Kunst. Die Societas Sancti Lucae (SSL) 1924–1981, licentiate thesis, University of Lucerne, 1982
- D. Gamboni, M. C. Morand, "Le 'renouveau de l'art sacré'. Notes sur la peinture d'église en Suisse romande, de la fin du XIXe siècle à la seconde guerre mondiale", in Nos monuments d'art et d'histoire, 36/1, 1985, 75–86
- M. C. Morand, "L'art religieux moderne en terre catholique. Histoire d'un monopole", in 19–39. La Suisse romande entre les deux guerres, 1986, 82–91
- F. Brentini, Die Schweizerische St. Lukasgesellschaft = Societas Sancti Lucae, SSL 1924–1986, 1987
- Le Groupe de St-Luc, 1995 (Patrimoine fribourgeois, 5)
- P. Rudaz, Carouge, foyer d'art sacré 1920–1945, 1998 (exhibition catalog)
- J. Wolańska, "'Groupe de Saint-Luc et de Saint-Maurice' i sztuka kościelna w Szwajcarii w okresie międzywojennym. The 'Groupe de Saint-Luc et de Saint-Maurice' and church art in Switzerland in the interwar period", in Sacrum et Decorum, 9, 2016, 71–96
- C. Noverraz, Le Groupe de Saint-Luc (1919–1945). Expression et quête d'identité d'une société artistique catholique dans l'Europe de l'entre-deux-guerres, doctoral thesis, University of Lausanne, 2 vols., 2022
- Gewagt! 100 Jahre gegenwärtig, 2024 (Jahrbuch Kunst + Kirche)
- C. Noverraz, Réinventer l'art sacré. Le Groupe de Saint-Luc (1919–1945), 2024
- C. Noverraz, V. Sauterel, Lumières nouvelles sur le sacré. Arts verriers du Groupe de Saint-Luc, 2024
- M. Hervé de Beaulieu, Oser l'art sacré, l'exemple du Groupe de Saint-Luc. Trésors des églises de Suisse romande, 2025

=== Sources ===
- A. Cingria, La décadence de l'art sacré, 1917
- Catalogue illustré des travaux exécutés par les membres du Groupe de Saint-Luc et Saint-Maurice, 1920
- A. Cingria, G. de Traz, "Groupe de Saint-Luc et Saint-Maurice", in L'Œuvre, 1924/1, 10
- A. Cingria, "Le mouvement d'art religieux en Suisse romande", in Das Werk, 12/12, 1925, 367–368
- Ars sacra. Schweizerisches Jahrbuch für christliche Kunst, 1927–1953
- A. Cingria, "Recueil de documents du Groupe romand de la Société de St-Luc", in L'Echo illustré, 4/15, 1933, 359–362
- A. Cingria, "Renaissance de l'art religieux", in Nova et Vetera, 1933/3, 307–323
- A. Cingria, "Histoire du Groupe Romand de la Société Saint Luc", in L'Art sacré, 1935/6, 26–28
- Annuaire romand de St-Luc, 1936
- Almanach romand de St-Luc, 1937
- L'art religieux en Suisse romande, 1937–1950 (series)
- P.-R. Régamey, "Deux grands foyers d'art chrétien. La Suisse romande et l'alémanique", in L'Art sacré, 1939/3, 75–84

=== Archives ===
- Archives de l'Evêché de Lausanne, Genève et Fribourg, Fribourg, Dossier Société de St-Luc, D 71
- École Polytechnique Fédérale de Lausanne, Lausanne, Archives de la construction moderne, Fernand Dumas
- Staatsarchiv Luzern, Lucerne, Schweizerische Lukasgesellschaft (SSL)
- University of Lausanne, Lausanne, Centre des littératures en Suisse romande, Alexandre Cingria
