= Swiss pavilion =

Venice Biennale national pavilion

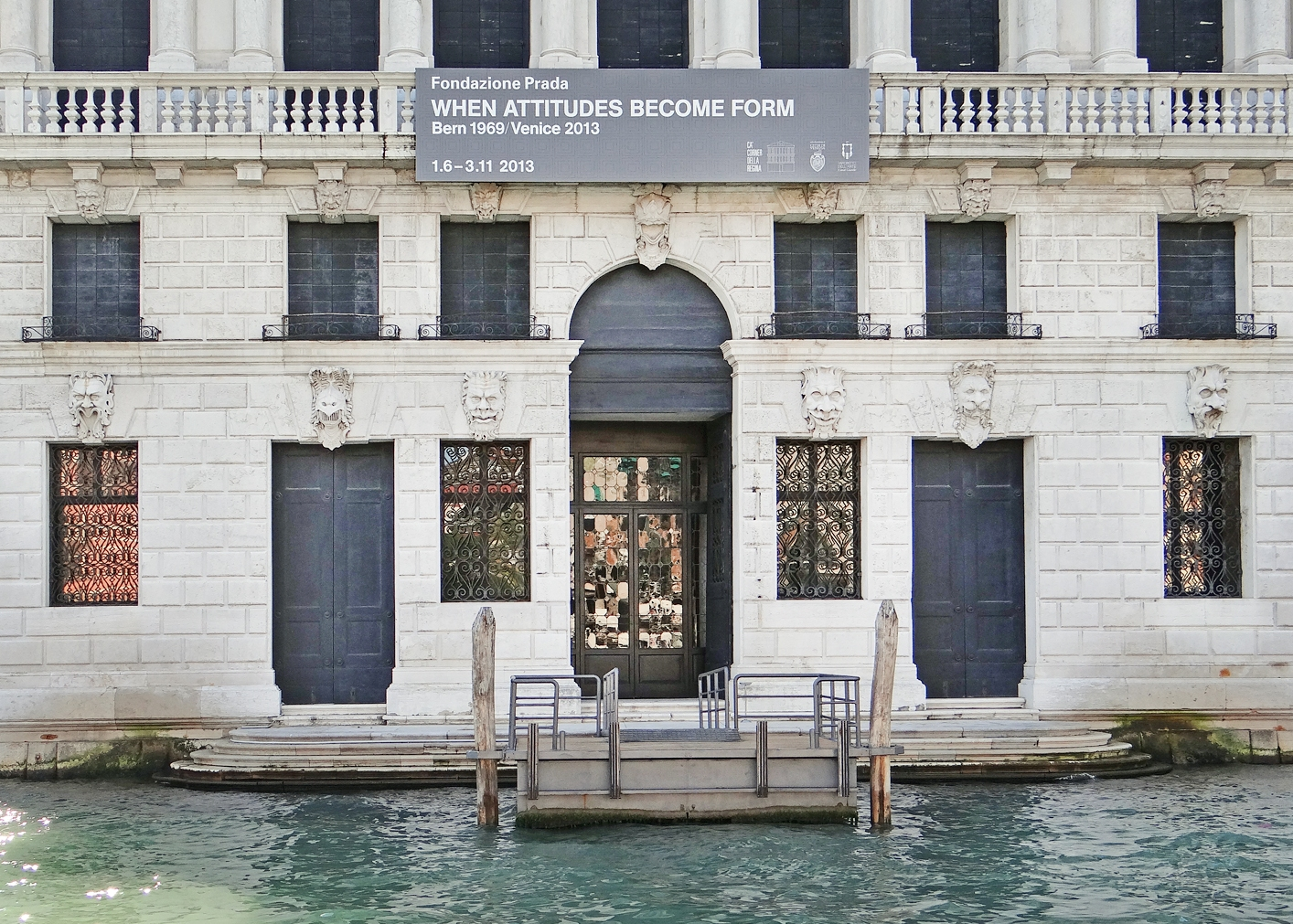
Le Palais Corner della Regina (Venise) (10351815544)

The Swiss pavilion houses Switzerland's national representation during the Venice Biennale arts festivals.

== Background ==
The Venice Biennale is an international art biennial exhibition held in Venice, Italy. Often described as "the Olympics of the art world", participation in the Biennale is a prestigious event for contemporary artists. The festival has become a constellation of shows: a central exhibition curated by that year's artistic director, national pavilions hosted by individual nations, and independent exhibitions held throughout Venice. The Biennale's parent organisation also runs regular festivals in other arts: architecture, dance, film, music and theatre.

Outside the central international exhibition, individual nations produce their own shows, known as pavilions, as their national representation. Nations that own their pavilion buildings – such as the 30 housed in the Giardini – are responsible for their own upkeep and construction costs as well. Nations without dedicated buildings create pavilions in venues throughout the city.

== Organization and building ==
The Swiss pavilion was designed by the Swiss architect Bruno Giacometti following a design competition and was constructed in 1952. It features multiple rooms linked by courtyards.

Between 1990 and 2009, Switzerland also used the San Stae church as exhibition venue. From 1932 until 1952 Switzerland had another pavilion, designed by Brenno Del Giudice on the island Sant'Elena.

As of 2012, Pro Helvetia has assumed responsibility for the Swiss contributions to the Venice Biennale.

== Representation by year ==
=== Art ===
- 1920 — Group exhibition
- 1926 — Group exhibition
- 1932 — Paul Bodmer, Numa Donzé, Augusto Giacometti, Karl Otto Hügin, Reinhold Kündig, Martin Lauterburg, Ernst Morgenthaler, Alfred Heinrich Pellegrini, Karl Geiser, Hermann Haller, Hermann Hubacher, Johann Jakob Probst, René Auberjonois, Maurice Barraud, Hans Berger, Abraham Hermanjat, Albert Carl Angst
- 1934 — Cuno Amiet, Hermann Haller
- 1936 — Aldo Patocchi, Emilio Maria Beretta, Max Uehlinger
- 1938 — Victor Surbek, Hermann Hubacher, Hans Berger
- 1940 — Louis René Moilliet, Johann Jakob Probst, Alexandre Blanchet
- 1942 — Karl Walser, Otto Charles Bänninger, Max Hunziker
- 1948 — Fritz Pauli, Franz Fischer, René Auberjonois, Albert Schnyder
- 1950 — Alfred Heinrich Pellegrini, Ernst Suter
- 1952 — Hans Fischer, Max Gubler, Johann Jakob Probst
- 1954 — Cuno Amiet, Carl Burckhardt, Paul Speck, Marcel Poncet
- 1956 — Hans Aeschbacher, Walter Bodmer, Johannes Burla, Eugen Häfelfinger, Walter Linck, Bernhard Luginbühl, Robert Müller, Erwin Rehmann, Sophie Taeuber-Arp, Louis Weber, André Gigon, Hansjörg Gisiger, René Monney, Antoine Poncet, Léon Prébandier, André Ramseyer, Serge Brignoni
- 1958 — Max Bill, Richard Paul Lohse, Camille Graeser, Theodor Bally, Wolf Barth, Walter Bodmer, Theo Eble, Fritz Glarner, Leo Leuppi, Louis René Moilliet, Wilfrid Moser, Max Rudolf von Mühlenen
- 1960 — Otto Tschumi, Varlin, Robert Müller
- 1962 — Albert Schilling, Paul Speck, Louis René Moilliet
- 1964 — Zoltán Kemény, Bernhard Luginbühl
- 1966 — Johannes Itten, Walter Linck
- 1968 — Fritz Glarner, Hans Aeschbacher
- 1970 — Peter Stämpfli, Walter Vögeli, Jean-Edouard Augsburger
- 1972 — Richard Paul Lohse, Willy Weber
- 1976 — Max Altorfer, Claude Loewer
- 1978 — Raffael Benazzi, Roland Hotz, Jean Lecoultre
- 1980 — Peter Steiner, Wilfrid Moser, Oscar Wiggli
- 1982 — Dieter Roth
- 1984 — Miriam Cahn
- 1986 — John Armleder, Aldo Walker
- 1988 — Markus Raetz
- 1990 — Olivier Mosset
- 1993 — Christoph Rütimann
- 1995 — Peter Fischli & David Weiss
- 1997 — Urs Frei, Helmut Federle
- 1999 — Roman Signer
- 2001 — Urs Luthi, Norbert Möslang, Andy Guhl
- 2003 — Emmanuelle Antille, Gerda Steiner, Jörg Lenzlinger
- 2005 — Pipilotti Rist, Ingrid Wildi, Gianni Motti, Shahryar Nashat, Marco Poloni (curator: Stefan Banz)
- 2007 — Yves Netzhammer, Ugo Rondinone, Urs Fischer, Christine Streuli (curators: Urs Staub, Andreas Münch)
- 2009 — Silvia Bächli, Fabrice Gygi (Commissioner: Andreas Münch, Curator: Urs Staub)
- 2011 — Thomas Hirschhorn/"Chewing the Scenery" (Curator: Andrea Thal)
- 2013 — Valentin Carron (Curator: Giovanni Carmine)
- 2015 — Pamela Rosenkranz (Curator: Susanne Pfeffer)
- 2017 — Carol Bove, Teresa Hubbard / Alexander Birchler (Curator: Philipp Kaiser)
- 2019 — Pauline Boudry / Renate Lorenz (Curator: Charlotte Laubard)
- 2022 — Latifa Echakhch, Alexandre Babel (Curator: Francesco Stocchi)
- 2024 — Guerreiro do Divino Amor (Curator: Andrea Bellini)

== Bibliography ==
- Russeth, Andrew (April 17, 2019). "The Venice Biennale: Everything You Could Ever Want to Know". ARTnews.
- Volpi, Cristiana (2013). "Switzerland". In Re Rebaudengo, Adele (ed.). Pavilions and Garden of Venice Biennale. Rome: Contrasto. p. 193. ISBN 978-88-6965-440-4.
