= Cingria =

Cingria is a surname. Notable people with the surname include:

- Alexandre Cingria (1879–1945), Swiss artist who worked as a painter, illustrator, and art restorer
- Charles-Albert Cingria (1883–1954), Swiss writer and musician
