= Jean-Louis Gampert =

Swiss painter and illustrator (1884–1942)

- Born: 8 February 1884; Geneva, Switzerland
- Died: 7 August 1942 (aged 58); Geneva, Switzerland
- Known for: Painting

Jean-Louis Gampert (1884-1942) was a Swiss painter and illustrator.

== Biography ==
Gampert was born 8 February 1884 in Geneva.

He learnt painting with Heinrich Knirr (de) in Munich and then learnt in the Paris atelier of Maurice Denis and Sérusier. He is known for engraving prints for La locandiera. He was a friend of Roger de La Fresnaye, and took care of him until his death. La Fresnaye made several portraits of Gampert, one of them in the collection of the Musée National d'Art Moderne in Paris. Gampert's work was influenced by La Fresnaye's monumental style stemming from synthetic cubism.

From 1925 till 1928 Emile Chambon worked with Gampert, assisting him in his atelier and with decorating the church of Corsier. From 1927, Gampert and Alexandre Cingria lead the École des Pâquis movement, which included artists such as Emilio-Maria Beretta, Albert Chavaz and Paul Monnier.

Jean-Louis Gampert died 7 August 1942 in Geneva.

== Works ==
=== Paintings and drawings ===
- Melon, 1924. Musée d'art et d'histoire, Geneva
- L'extase de sainte Thérèse. Fondation Emile Chambon, Geneva
- Portrait de Mme Tronchin, 1924. Museum of Modern Art, Troyes
- Portrait de Jacques Chenevière (1886-1976), hommes de lettres genevois, 1924. Geneva Public Library
- Sketch for the costume of Olivia in "La Nuit des rois" by Shakespeare, 1914

=== Illustrations ===
- Mesure pour mesure by William Shakespeare, traduction et préface de Guy de Pourtalès, Paris : Société littéraire de France Paris, 1921 (wood engravings)
- Théâtre de Clara Gazul by Prosper Mérimée, Paris, édition de la nouvelle revue française, 1922
- La Route aplanie by Marius Besson, 1931

== Bibliography ==
- FERRARE, Henri, Jean-Louis Gampert, Neuchâtel, Edition de la Baconnière, 1937
- Jean-Louis Gampert, exhibition catalogue, Geneva, Palais de l'Athénée, October 1943
- SCHURR, Gérald, 1820-1920. Les petits maîtres de la peinture, valeur de demain, Editions de l'amateur, 1979, p. 162
- OSTERWALDER, Marcus (sous la direction de), Dictionnaire des illustrateurs, 1890-1945, Éditions Ides et Calendes, 1992. p. 419
- CLERC, Philippe, Émile Chambon (1905-1993) la magie du réalisme, Somogy, Paris, 2011
