= Poncet =

Poncet may refer to:

- Place Antonin-Poncet, Lyon, France
- Poncet Platform, a telescope mount
- Poncet (surname)
