= Théophile Robert =

Swiss painter (1879–1954)

- Born: 12 August 1879; Ried, Biel/Bienne, Switzerland
- Died: 24 February 1954 (aged 74); Neuchâtel, Switzerland
- Education: École des Beaux-Arts
- Spouse: Agnès Miéville (m. 1908)

Théophile Robert, also Paul-Théophile Robert (12 August 1879 – 24 February 1954), was a Swiss painter. He placed his work within the movement of the return to classical order and achieved international recognition, and from 1929 he turned to monumental religious art.

== Biography ==
Théophile Robert was the son of Paul Robert and a great-nephew of Léopold Robert. In 1908 he married Agnès Miéville.

Robert received his first artistic training from his father. He then went to Florence in 1899 and to Paris from 1900 to 1907, where he attended the École des Beaux-Arts. After settling in Saint-Blaise, he explored various artistic models (Paul Cézanne, Ferdinand Hodler, Maurice Denis) before leaving again for Paris in 1918. Close to the purists Amédée Ozenfant and Le Corbusier, he placed his work within the movement of the return to classical order and achieved international recognition. He was one of the artists whose collaboration was secured by the Groupe de Saint-Luc et Saint-Maurice, a cooperative founded in Geneva in 1919 to offer work for the decoration of churches, from which the Groupe de Saint-Luc originated.

Mural by Robert in the Catholic church of Saint-Blaise

After returning to Saint-Blaise in 1929, Robert turned to monumental religious art, with a Way of the Cross (Chemin de croix) in the church of Tavannes (1929) and the decoration of the church of Saint-Blaise (1939).

== Bibliography ==
- C. Charles, Théophile Robert, 2008
