= Emilio Maria Beretta =

Swiss painter (1907–1974)

- Born: 27 March 1907; Muralto, Switzerland
- Died: 1 July 1974 (aged 67); Geneva, Switzerland
- Education: School of Fine Arts, Geneva
- Spouses: Isabelle Cingria; Monique Hentsch
- Awards: Veillon Prize (1952)

Emilio Maria Beretta (27 March 1907 – 1 July 1974) was a Swiss painter and stage designer from Ticino. From the 1930s he painted numerous murals and frescoes, especially in Ticino and in French-speaking Switzerland.

== Biography ==
Emilio Maria Beretta was the son of Efrem Beretta, director of the Locarno brewery (Birreria di Locarno), and Maria née Martinoni, a teacher. He married first Isabelle Cingria, daughter of Alexandre Cingria, and second Monique Hentsch, daughter of Aloïs.

A painter and stage designer, Beretta trained under Fernand Bovy at the School of Fine Arts in Geneva from 1923 to 1929, and in 1930 he attended the studio of Gino Severini in Paris. Close to Alexandre Cingria and Jean-Louis Gampert, he worked in French-speaking Switzerland until 1936. He was a member of the Swiss Society of Saint Luke, founded to promote the renewal of sacred art in Switzerland, and from the 1930s he painted numerous murals and frescoes, especially in Ticino and French-speaking Switzerland. According to a list published in 1936, he was one of the five members from Ticino of the society's regional group for French-speaking Switzerland, the Groupe romand de Saint-Luc.

In 1945 Beretta settled in Gordevio. In 1952 he received the Veillon Prize for painting, and with four other Ticinese artists he formed the Gruppo della Barca. He lived in Paris again from 1954 to 1964, when he moved permanently to Troinex. In his last years he devoted himself mainly to stage design for the theater.

== Bibliography ==
- J. M. Marquis, Emilio Maria Beretta, 1986
- Emilio Maria Beretta. Nature morte, exhibition catalog, Locarno, 1989
- Biografisches Lexikon der Schweizer Kunst, 1998, 94–95
