= Léo-Paul Robert =

Swiss painter

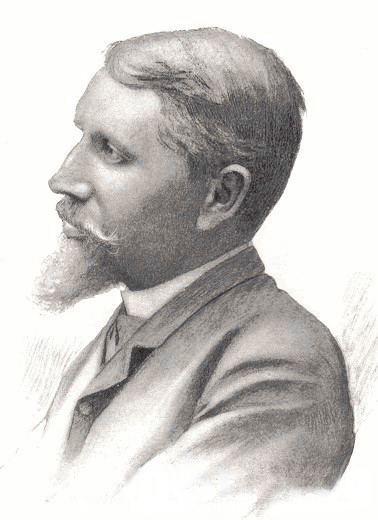
- Born: 19 March 1851; Biel/Bienne
- Died: 10 October 1923; Orvin
- Education: Academy of Fine Arts, Munich
- Occupations: Painter, illustrator
- Father: Aurèle Robert

Léo-Paul Samuel Robert (19 March 1851 - 10 September 1923), also known as Paul Robert, was a Swiss painter, known for his depictions of birds and other wildlife.

== Early life ==
Paul Robert was born in Biel/Bienne, Switzerland, on 19 March 1851, to Aurèle Robert, who, like his brother Louis Léopold Robert was a painter.

Paul trained under his father, and then, in 1869, at the Munich Academy of Arts.

After the death of his father in December 1871, he visited Verona, Venice, Ravenna, Bologna and Florence.

== Career ==
After initially painting allegories, Robert turned his talents next to landscapes, and eventually to watercolours of birds and caterpillars.

His painting Zéphyrs d'un beau soir won a gold medal when exhibited at the Paris Salon in 1877.

From 1886 to 1894, he was responsible for the decoration of the staircase at the Musée des beaux-arts de Neuchâtel (now the Musée d'Art et d'Histoire), comprising three monumental murals; still extant.

He illustrated an edition of Jeremias Gotthelf's 1842 book The Black Spider.

From 1891 to 1897 he was a member of the Swiss Federal Commission of Fine Arts and from 1894 to 1918 of the Commission of the Gottfried Keller Foundation.

In 1900 he made a mosaic mural in glass, "The Age of History", also extant, and featuring the figures of Poetry and History, for the facade of the Bern Historical Museum.

Robert was also ordained as a minister in the protestant tradition.

He died on 10 October 1923 in Orvin, Switzerland.

== Legacy ==
Three of Robert's sons Théophile, Philippe and Paul-André were painters; Paul-André also painted nature subjects.

Several of his works are in the Musée d'Art et d'Histoire at Neuchâtel.

The Neues Museum Biel houses the 3,000 works of the "Foundation Robert", including hundreds by Paul, and others by the rest of his family.

The street Paul-Robert-Weg in Biel/Bienne is named in his honour.

== Gallery ==
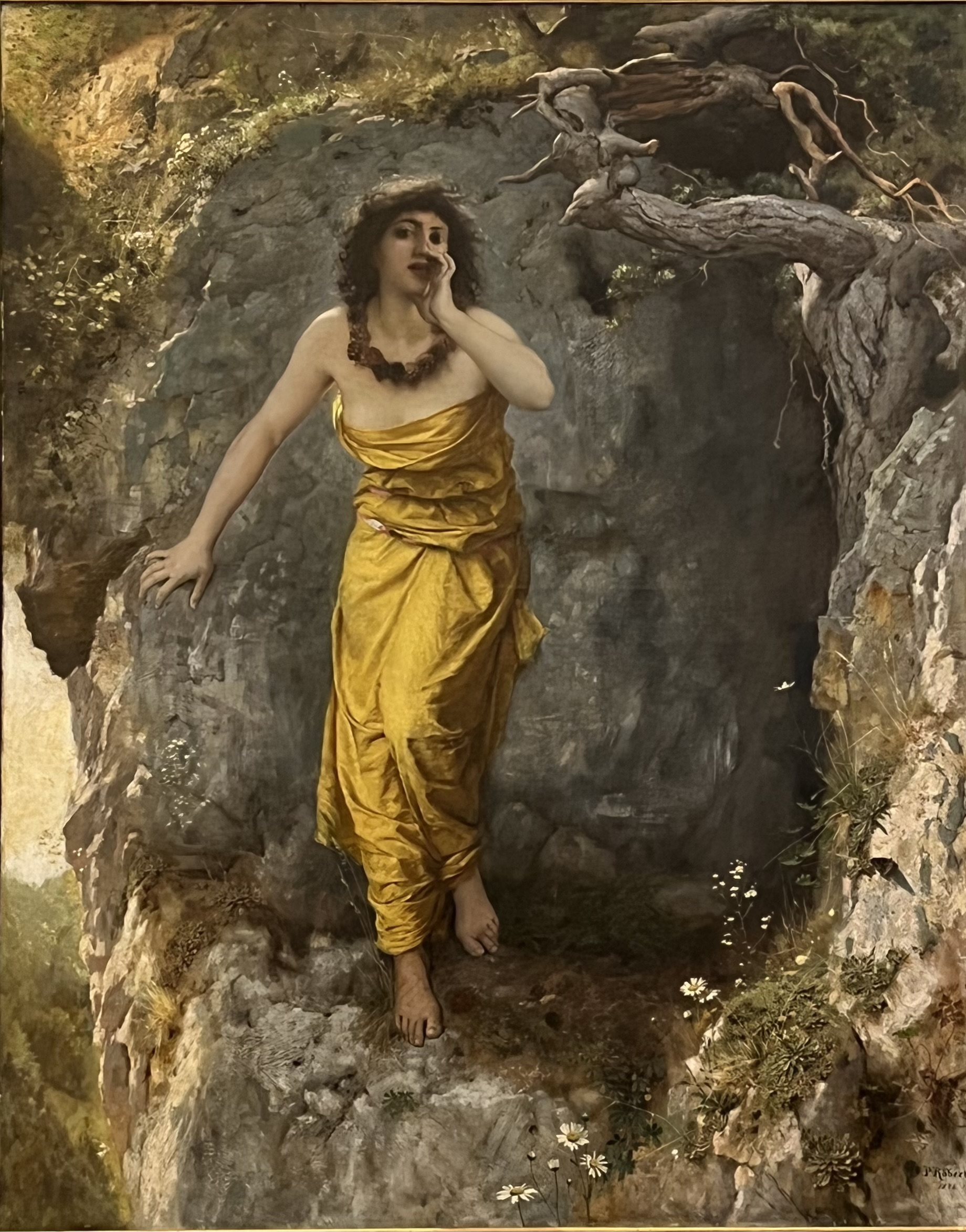
The Echo in the Kunstmuseum Bern

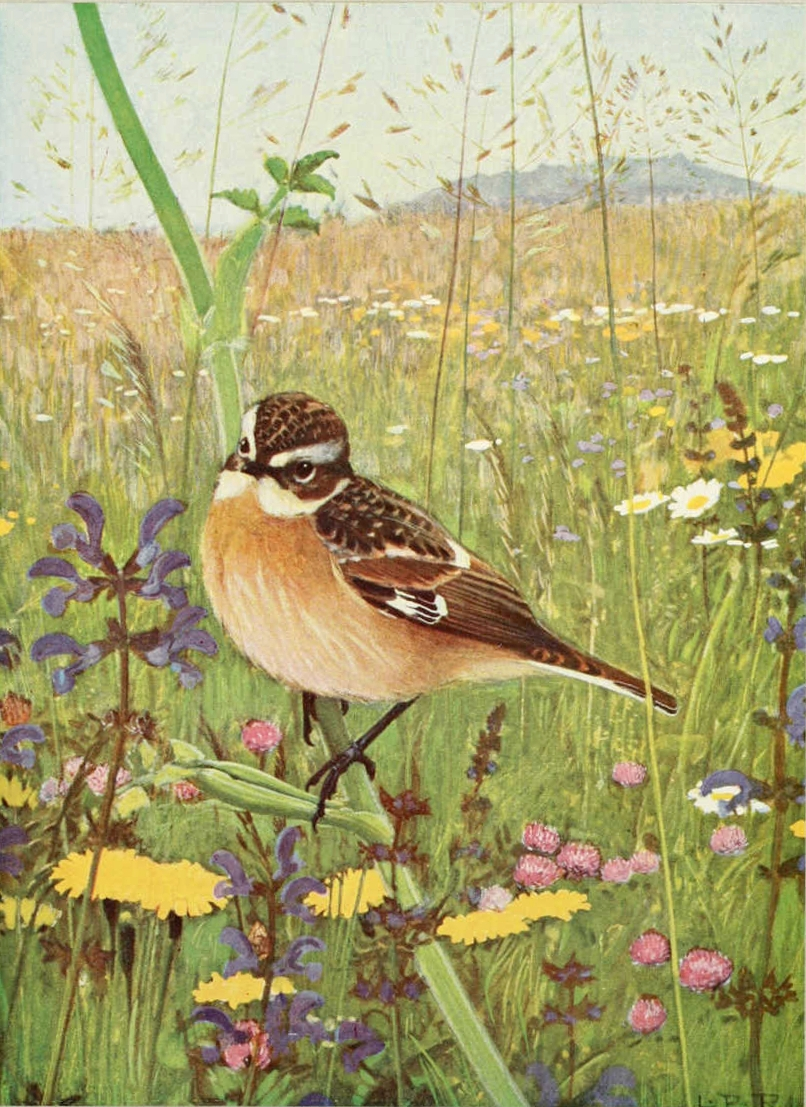
Robert's painting of a Whinchat (Saxicola rubetra; circa 1870)

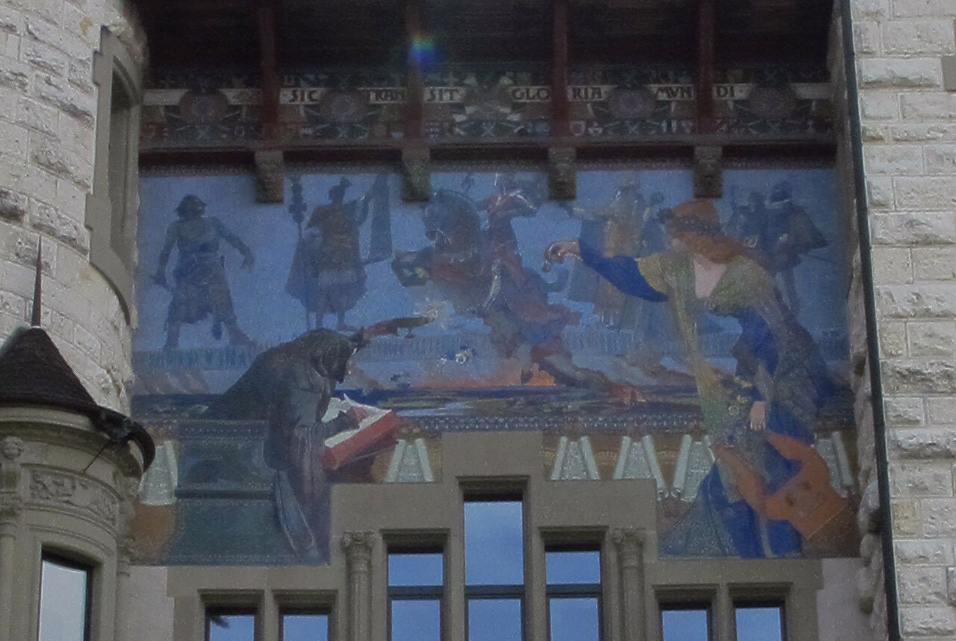
Glass mural at Bern Historical Museum

== Works illustrated ==
- Rambert, Eugene (1916). Les Oiseaux Dans La Nature.
