= Paul Monnier =

Swiss painter

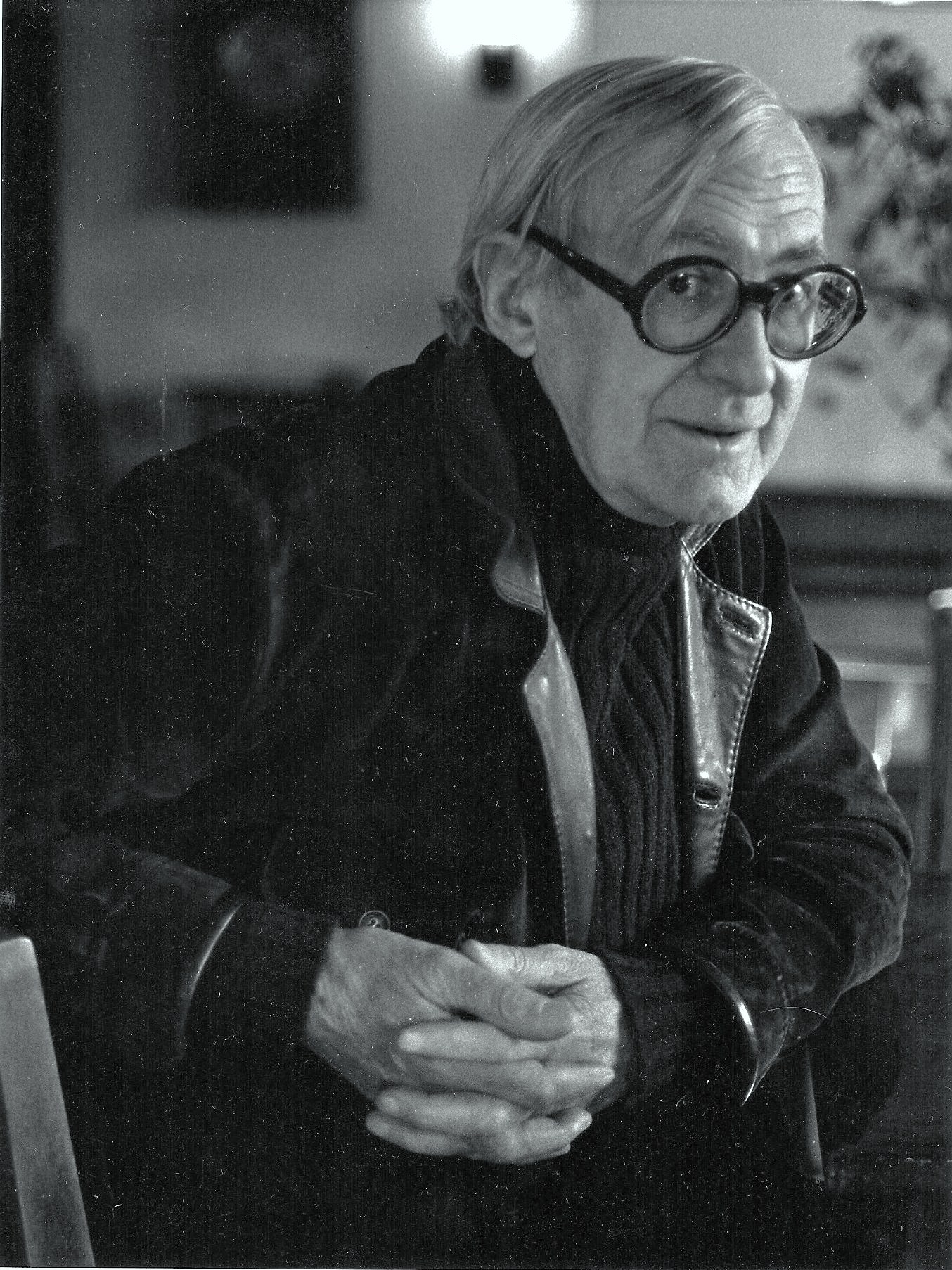
Monnier in 1975

Paul Monnier (1907–1982) was a Swiss painter.

== Biography ==
Monnier was born in Montana-Vermala. From 1924 to 1930, he studied at the Ecole des Beaux-Arts in Geneva, took multiple trips in Italy and France, and was a member of the fr:Ecole des Pâquis.

"The 'Ecole des Pâquis' occurred simply and effortlessly, naturally putting aside any cumbersome conceit and any personal outburst. ...These artists belong to this post-war generation which no longer dreams of superman. The subtleties of their craft come before aesthetic theories. Whenever laziness, alcohol, Bohemia and fiddling don't tempt them, they are capable of efforts far more disciplined than those we have made in the past 30 years. In a nutshell, long live the post-war youth that we have so run down." (Alexandre Cingria, 1929)

From 1930 to 1932, Monnier journeyed in India, Indo-China, and Tonkin. In a letter to C. J., Paul Monnier writes: "I'm wasting my time trying to abolish this job from my life. Painting is my job, my real and only job." (Vizagapatam, June 3, 1931).

After he returned, Monnier devoted himself to painting and lived successively in Geneva (1932–1936), Sierre Valais (1936–1949), Lausanne (1949–1970) and Geneva again until his death (1970–1982).

== Exhibitions ==
- Switzerland: Geneva; Sion; Sierre; Martigny; Zurich.
- Italy: Milano, Ve Triennale.

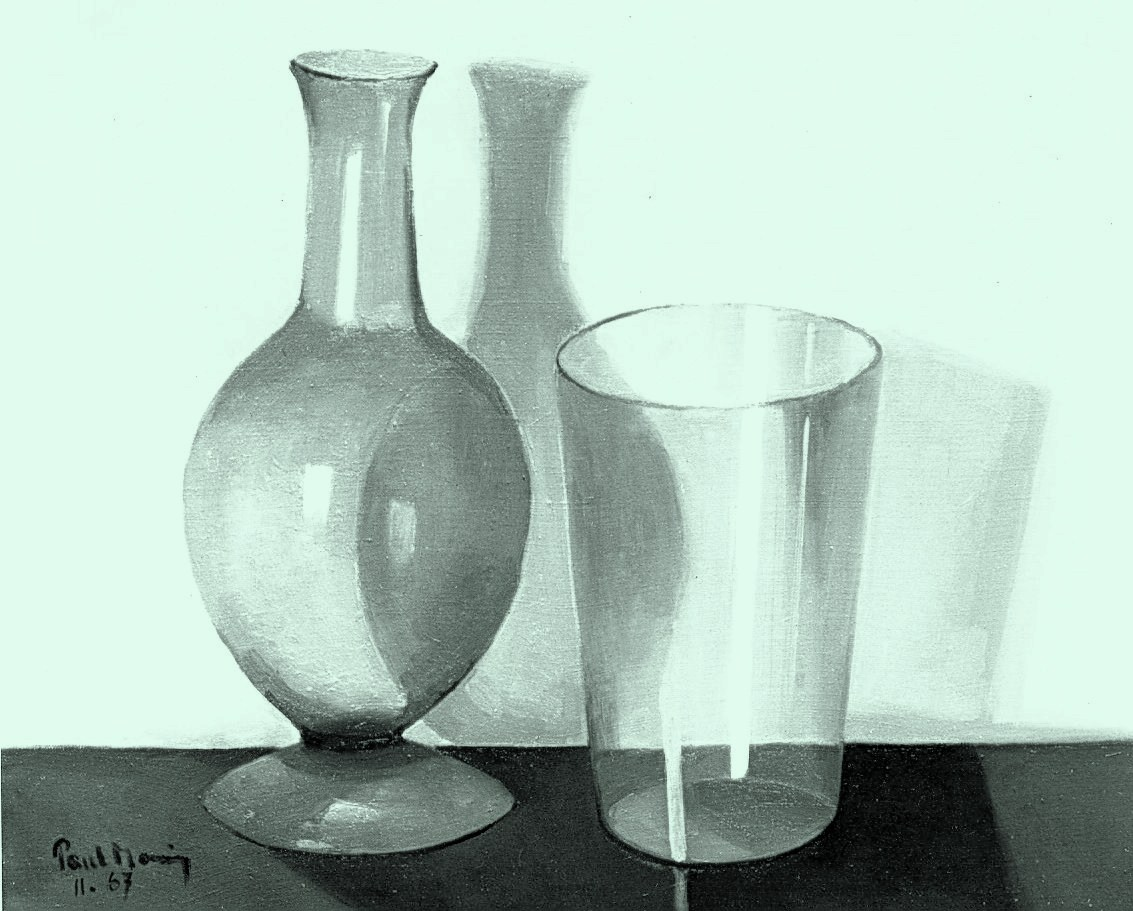
Verre de Venise, 54x65 cm, oil on canvas, 1967

- Spain: Madrid, International Exhibition of Arts and Crafts.
- Austria: Salzburg, Kirchliche Kunst.
- USSR: Moscow, Swiss Artists.
- France: Paris, Salon international de l'Art libre; Paris, Salon des Artistes français (invited).

== Mural paintings, stained glass, mosaic ==
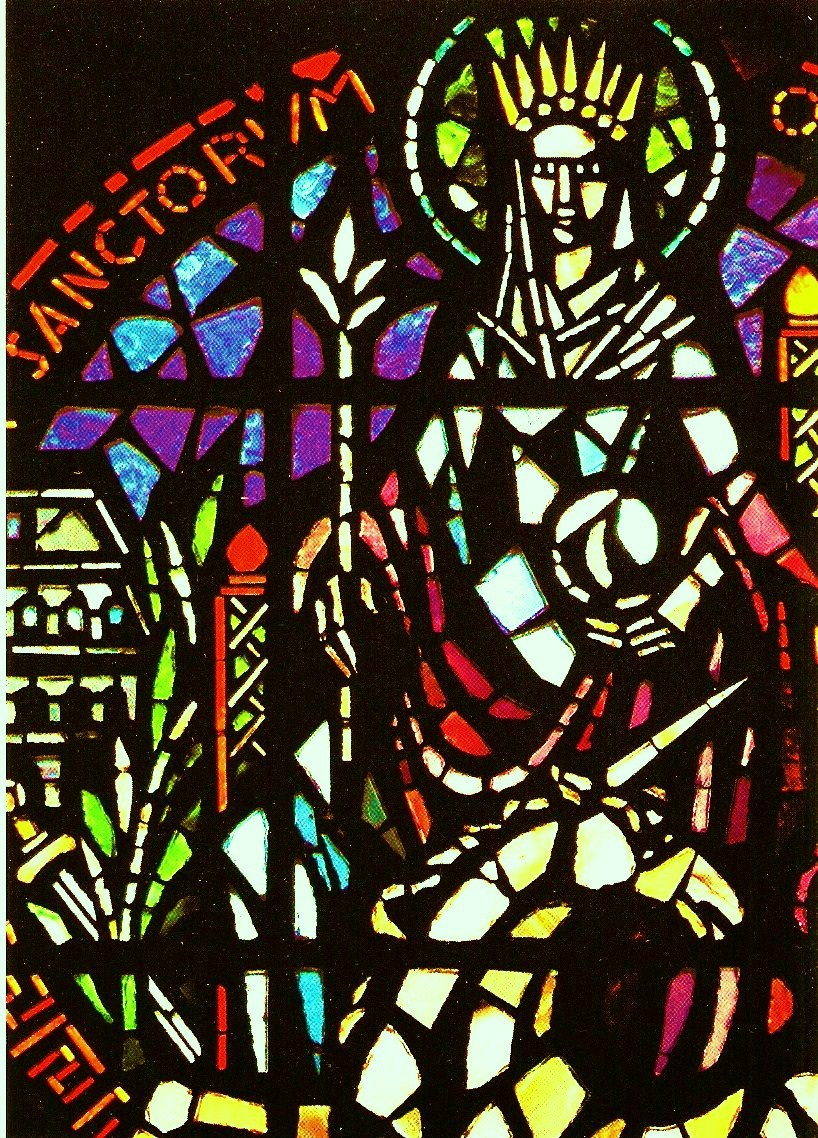

- India: Yenubaruvu.
- France: Le Fayet, Eglise Notre-Dame des Alpes (Architect: Maurice Novarina).
- Switzerland, among more than 60 works: St. Maurice's Abbey, Sion (Cathedral), Sion (St Ursule's Chapel), Crans-Montana (Parish church), Viège (St Martin's church), Zurich (St Konrad's church), Zurich-Enge (Three-Kings' church), Dubendorf (Maria- Friedenskirche), Lausanne (St Joseph's church), and Geneva (Notre-Dame's basilica).
- Paul Monnier worked with Alexandre Cingria and Gino Severini (Lausanne, Notre-Dame du Valentin).

== Illustrations ==
- Nourritures valaisannes. Maurice Zermatten, LUF, Fribourg, 1938.
- Notre ami le Vin. Pierre Courthion, W. Egloff, Fribourg, 1943.
- Le parcours du Haut-Rhône. Charles-Albert Cingria, W. Egloff, Fribourg, 1944.
- Le bazar de la Charité. Paul Morand, Club des Bibliophiles, Genève, 1944.

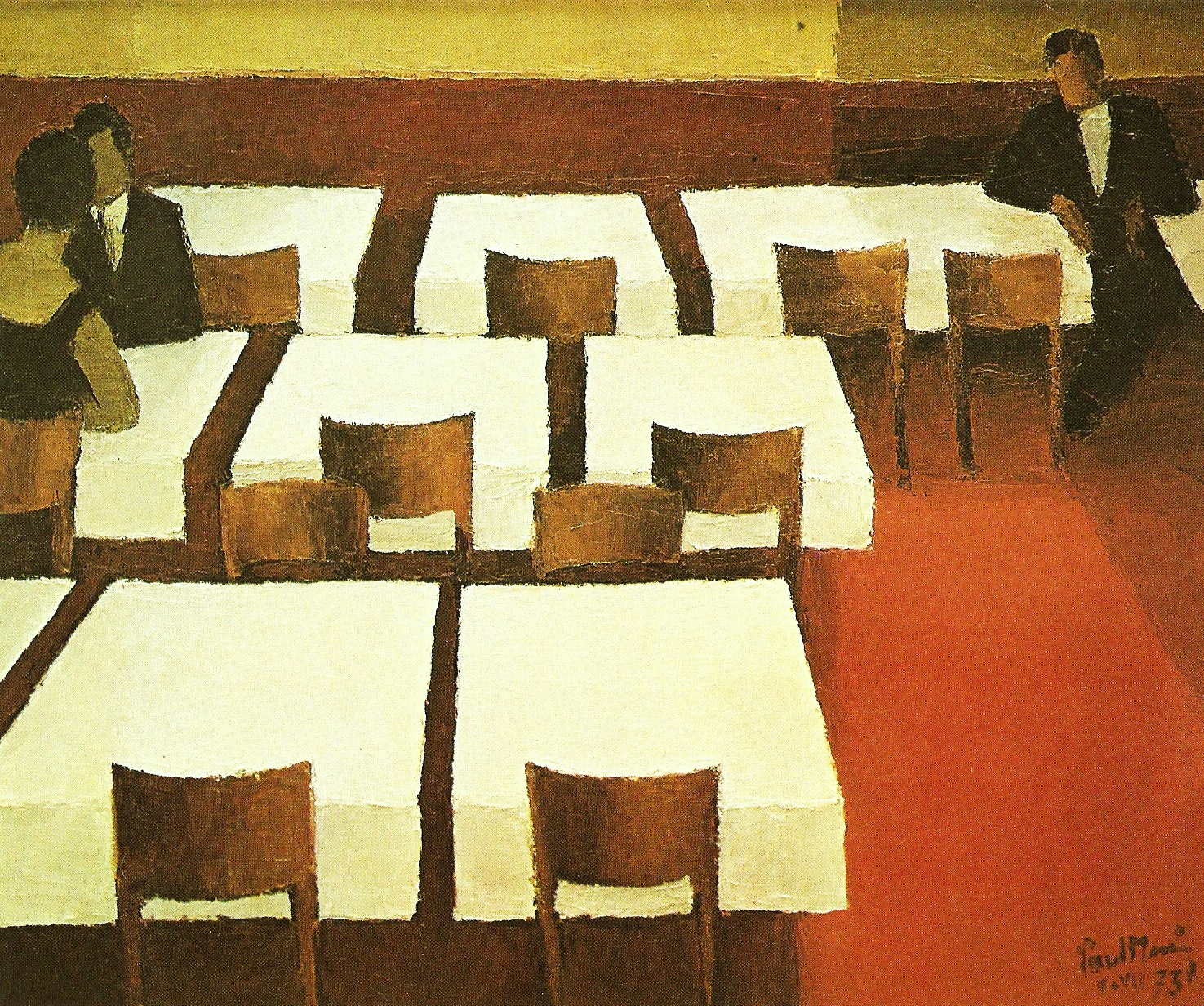
Les tables, 54x65cm, oil on canvas, 1973

"Paul Monnier's work is firstly and mainly painting. This truism conceals a constant proceeding, highly true to itself and to the craft - which is not a minor achievement given a world where creative activity seems to be more and more confined by concept and word jugglers! Cancelled movement, suspended vibration, objects and figures immobilized in their inmost loneliness, our glance seizes the composition like a wordless poem, a soundless music. The full circle of the creative route is then completed and painting joins its own mystery." (Bernard Zumthor, 1975)

== Bibliography ==
- Humbert Anthonioz, Paul Monnier, illustrateur, in Almanach du Cheval Ailé, 1947, Editions du Cheval Ailé, Genève, 1947.
- Maurice Zermatten, Paul Monnier, peintre, Editions de la Baconnière, Neuchâtel, 1938.
- Bernard Zumthor, Paul Monnier, Editions de la Matze, Sion, 1975.
