= Fernand Dumas =

Swiss architect (1892–1956)

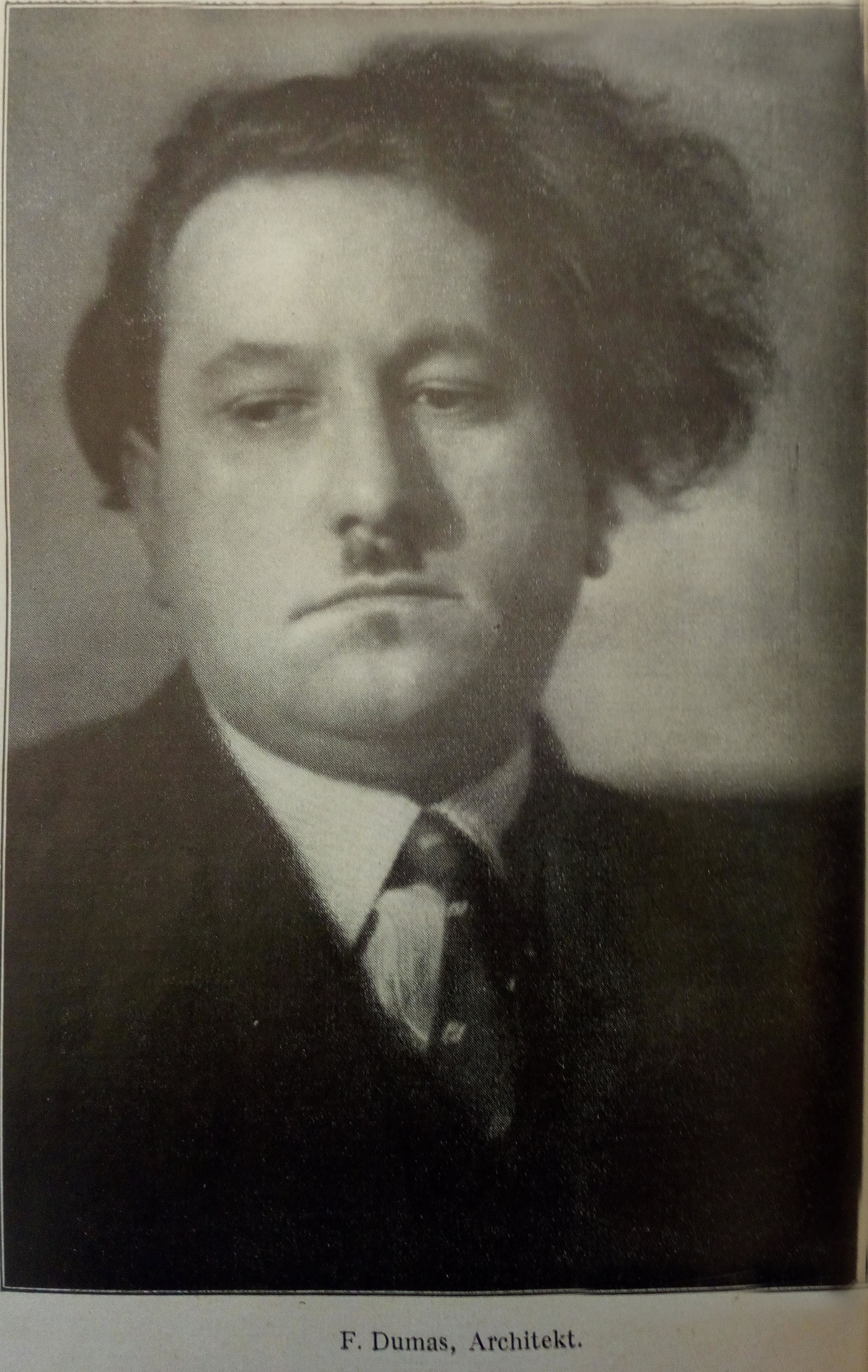
- Photograph published in 1933
- Born: 4 January 1892; Moudon, Switzerland
- Died: 20 October 1956 (aged 64); Locarno, Switzerland
- Occupation: Architect
- Spouse: Andrée Thoos
- Buildings: Church of St. Peter, Fribourg; Parish church of Orsonnens; Parish church of Mézières; Miséricorde building, University of Fribourg (with Denis Honegger)

Fernand Dumas (4 January 1892 – 20 October 1956) was a Swiss architect. In the 1920s and 1930s he built about 15 Catholic churches, and he was one of the most emblematic representatives of the Groupe de Saint-Luc.

== Biography ==
Fernand Dumas was the son of Placide Dumas, a timber merchant, and Albine née Piller. He married Andrée Thoos. After training at the technical college (Technikum) in Fribourg and in Munich, he opened his own office in Romont in 1922 as an architect and member of the Swiss Society of Engineers and Architects (SIA).

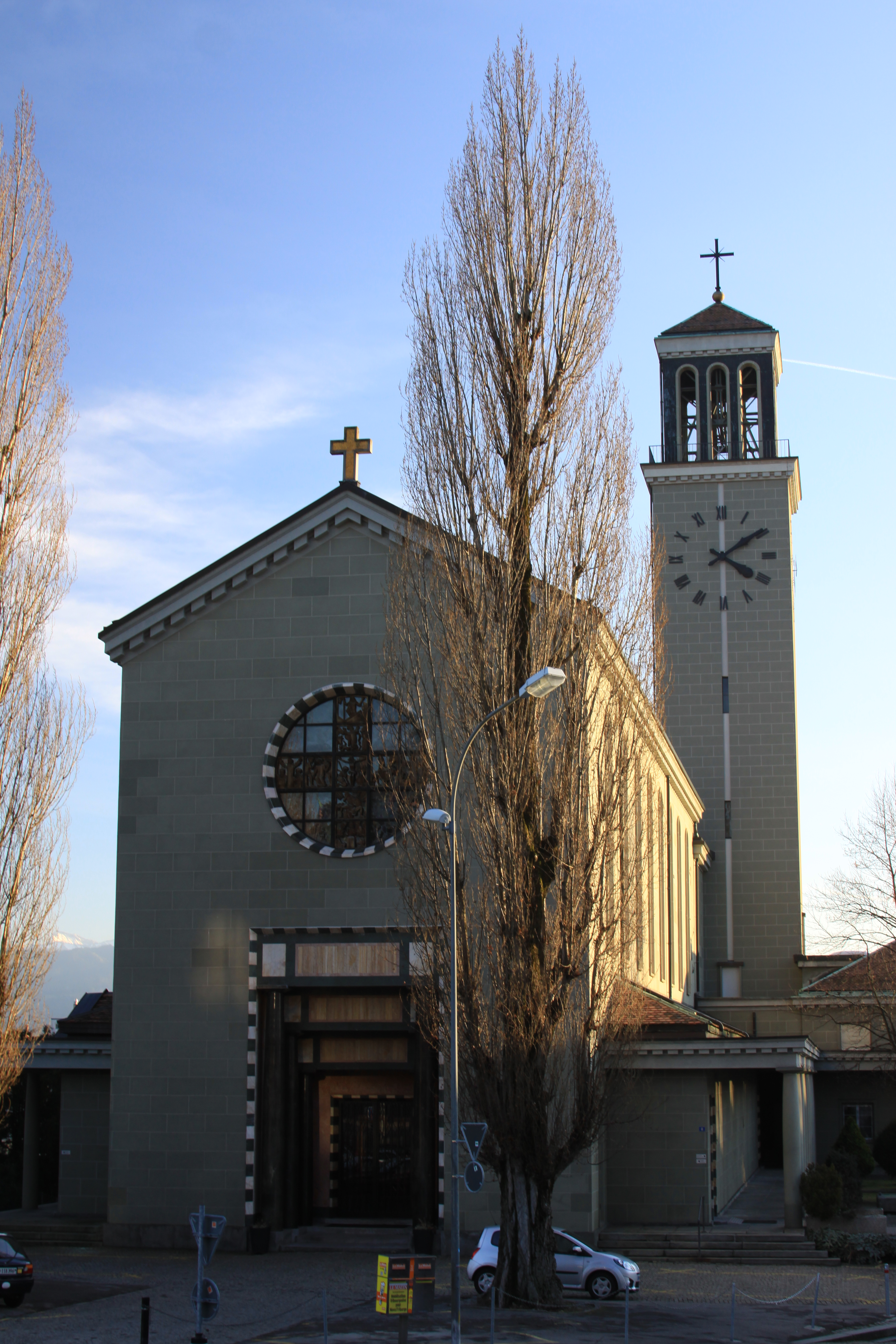
Church of St. Peter in Fribourg

In the 1920s and 1930s Dumas built about 15 Catholic churches, including the church of St. Peter (Saint-Pierre) in Fribourg and the parish churches of Orsonnens and Mézières, and he carried out dozens of alterations in the cantons of Fribourg, Vaud, Bern, and Valais. Stylistically, his work lies between neoclassicism and modernism. He worked with, among others, Alexandre Cingria, Gino Severini, Marcel Feuillat, Willy Brandt, François Baud, and Willy Jordan. With Denis Honegger, he was involved in the construction of the Miséricorde building of the University of Fribourg (1938–1941).

From 1927 Dumas was a leading member of the Societas Sancti Lucae (Lukas-Gesellschaft), whose aim was the renewal of Christian art in the tradition of early Christianity. From 1951 to 1956 he was a member of the Federal Art Commission (Eidgenössische Kunstkommission). He was one of the most emblematic representatives of the Groupe de Saint-Luc.

== Bibliography ==
- A. Lauper, "Nova et vetera", in Patrimoine fribourgeois, 5, 1995, 17–28, 54–60 (with a list of works)
- Architektenlexikon der Schweiz 19./20. Jahrhundert, 1998, 152–153

=== Archives ===
- École Polytechnique Fédérale de Lausanne, Lausanne, Archives de la construction moderne, Fernand Dumas
