= Pauline Boudry & Renate Lorenz =

German artist duo

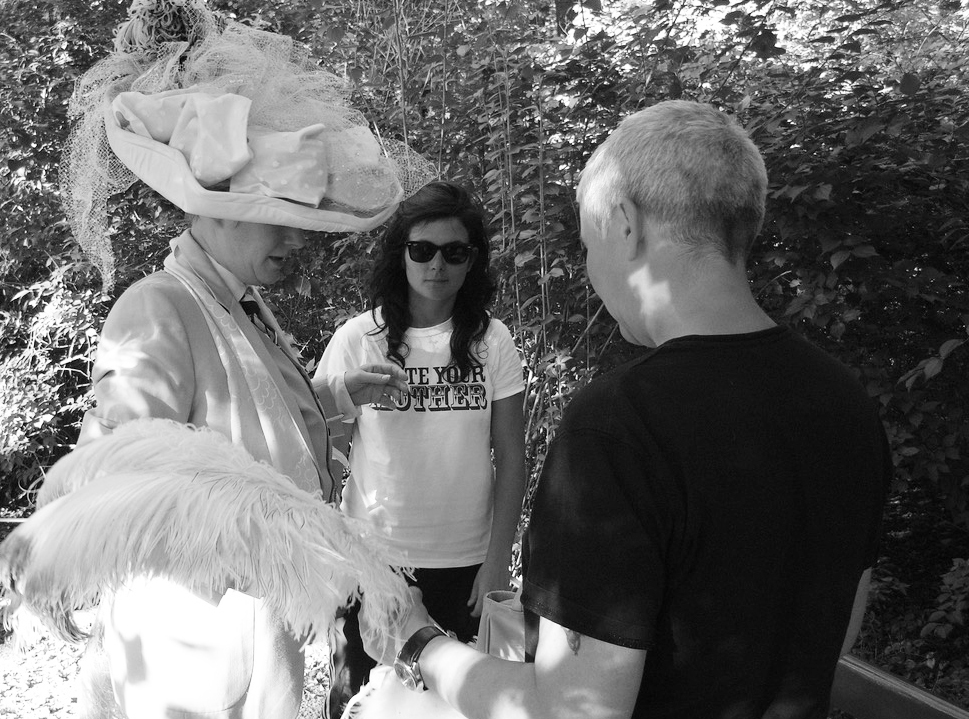
On the set of Charming For The Revolution (Werner Hirsch, Pauline Boudry, Renate Lorenz)

Pauline Boudry & Renate Lorenz are a Berlin-based artist duo, conceptually working with filmed performances. Their installations often include film and sculptures, as well as programmed elements, for instance moving curtains, stages, blinds, or animated smoke. Their performers are artists, dancers, choreographers, and musicians, with whom they establish long-term relationships. Visibility and opacity as well as queer companionship are recurring themes in their presentations. Their work has been shown internationally, for instance at the 58th Venice Biennale (Swiss Pavilion), 2019, at the Palacio Cristal/Museo Reina Sofia in Madrid (2022/23) and at the São Paulo Biennale 2024.

== Early life and education ==
Renate Lorenz was born in 1963 in Bonn and studied theatre at the Institute for Applied Theatre in Giessen alongside René Pollesch. Their performance background instigated their deep interest in collaboration, the stage, music, and non-conventional ways of acting. Renate Lorenz later completed a master’s degree at the Academy of Media Arts Cologne.

In the late 1980s, Jochen Becker and Renate Lorenz formed the artist group Büro Bert. From 1992 to 1996, Silvia Kafehsy, Marion von Osten, Ursula Biemann and Renate Lorenz curated at Shedhalle Zürich, where they developed a radical and feminist program, that had a significant influence on a generation of curators working with research-based exhibitions. Renate Lorenz, as a professor for art and research, has been co-directing, together with Annette Baldauf, the PhD in Practice program at the Academy of Fine Arts in Vienna since 2010.

Pauline Boudry was born 1972 in Lausanne and studied at the Geneva Art Academy (HEAD). She has described her Bulgarian origin and the artistic legacy of her family—including her great-grandfather, the Symbolist painter C. C. Olsommer—as formative influences. Drawn to collective modes of working, she became involved in group projects early on. In 1997, she co-curated the feminist exhibition Environ 27 ans in Geneva, where she established connections with artists such as Julie Ault or Renée Green. In 1999 she co-founded the queer electronic band Rhythm King and her Friends in Berlin, with which she was active until 2008 and toured extensively. Pauline Boudry taught between 2005 and 2008 at the Kunsthochschule Weissensee Berlin, between 2009 and 2023 at the ZHdK Zürich, and has been at HEAD Geneva since 2023.

Renate Lorenz and Pauline Boudry work together since 1998, first in different collectives and then from 2007 as a duo.

== Work ==
Two terms have been brought up in connection to Boudry & Lorenz’s work: Temporal Drag and Queer Archeology. The fitst film installations often connect to figures, traces, songs, or photographs from the past. These are used as “scores” for a contemporary performance. They engage with “friends from the past” to foreground multiple temporalities simultaneously, drawing on underground drag performance practices as well as performance strategies that disrupt normative conceptions of time. Mathias Danbolt has described how “queer archeology” as a practice of looking back reactivates revolutionary moments that never got realized, thus bringing imagined futures into being.

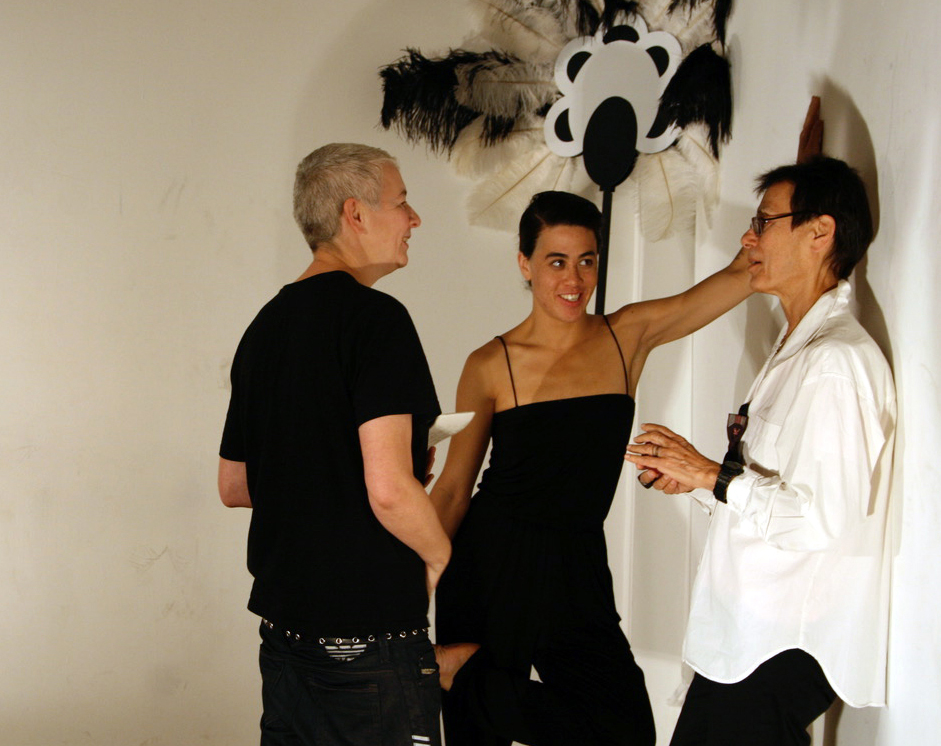
Renate Lorenz, together with Yvonne Rainer and Wu Tsang on the set of the film Salomania, 2008

Normal Work (2007) engages with an obscure archive of photographic self-portraits from a maid in Victorian London–crossing the realms of labor and S/M sexuality–which became the starting point for a performance by Werner Hirsch. in N.O. Body (2008), in a set-up influenced by Jack Smith, Werner Hirsch reanimates another photographic archive of sexual and gender diversity created by sexual scientist Magnus Hirschfeld in the 1930s. The film Salomania (2009) brings together postmodern dance choreographer Yvonne Rainer and artist Wu Tsang as performers, engaging with the partly forgotten Art Nouveau film Salomé by Alla Nazimova from 1923. Across these three film installations, contemporary performance is set in dialogue with found objects from the past, which are often presented in the exhibition space alongside the film. In Toxic (2012), there is a change of perspective. Boudry & Lorenz still refer to histories of visuality that employed scrutinizing practices such as the so-called mug-shot, but within the filmed performances they stage their own fictional archive.

=== Scores ===
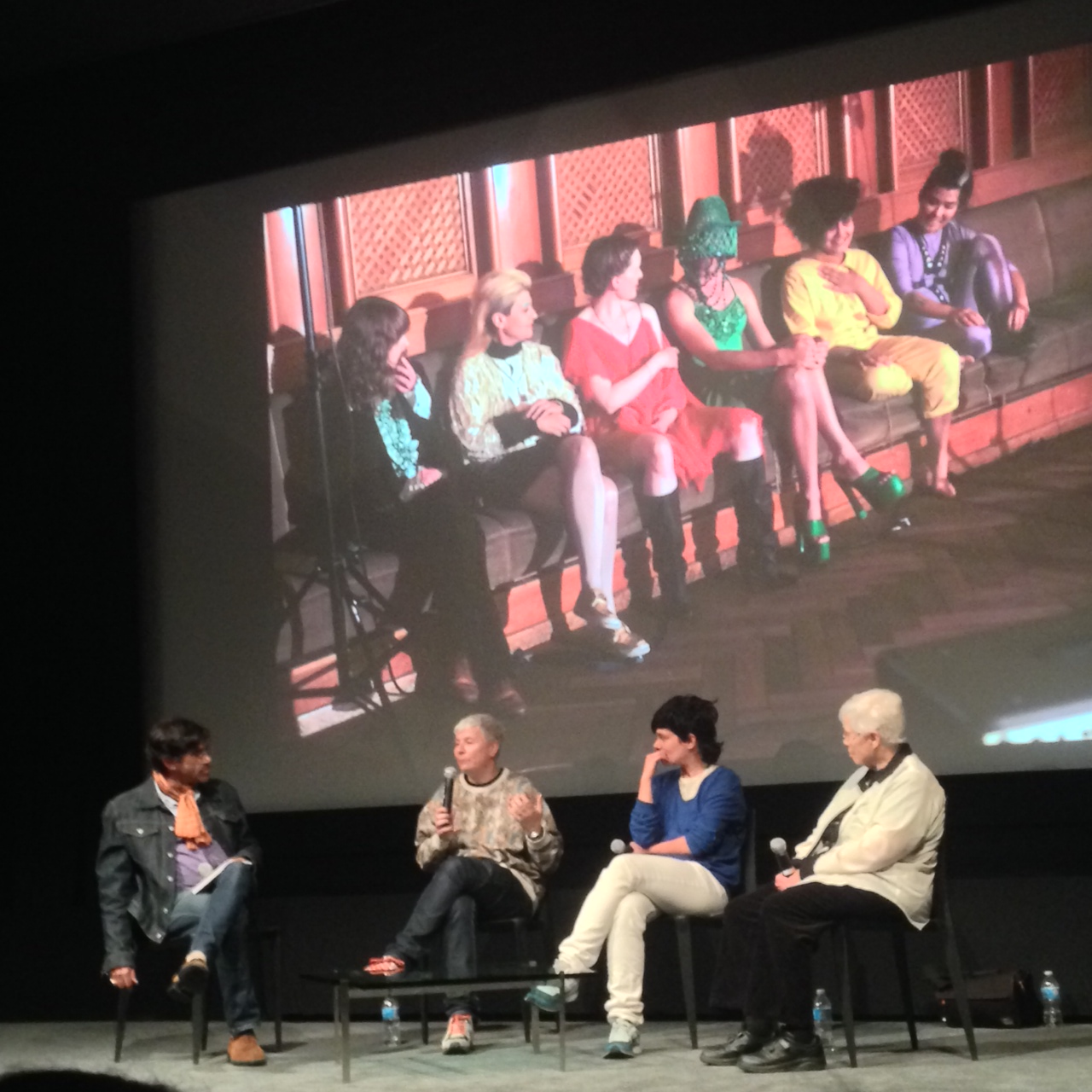
Pauline Boudry & Renate Lorenz with Pauline Oliveros and Gregg Bordowitz, discussing Oliveros’ score "To Valerie Solanas ..." at MoMA, 2014

Between 2013 and 2017, Boudry & Lorenz produced a series of film installations inspired by seminal experimental scores. In To Valerie Solanas and Marilyn Monroe in Recognition of Their Desperation (2013), a score by Pauline Oliveros, they invite five musicians to re-imagine the radical feminist composition in a filmed interpretation, in which the camera itself takes over the role of an additional performer. In dialogue with Oliveros’s work, the film explores the possibilities and limits of a queer politics grounded in abstract forms. It is filmed in Funkhaus Nalepastraße, the former GDR Radio studios in Berlin, and featuring performances from the musicians Ray Aggs, Peaches, Catriona Shaw, Verity Susman, Ginger Brooks Takahashi, and William Wheeler. The work was shown at Museum of Modern Art, New York, in a special event with the artists, Oliveros and Gregg Bordowitz in May 2014. In Silent (2016), performer Aéréa Negrot interprets John Cage‘s score 4´33´´ from 1952, which asks the musicians to remain silent. According to Maya Hoberman, the work examines the separation between silence as being subversive and liberating (like in silent protests) and being silenced, where silence can be a result of violence, or surveillance.Telepathic Improvisation (2017), based on Pauline Oliveros’s eponymous 1975 score, refers to the power of telepathy and paradoxically invites visitors watching the film installation in the exhibition space to telepathically transmit music and actions to the performers in the film.

=== Dance ===
In the late 2010s, Boudry & Lorenz explored more deeply the transformative power of movement, starting long-term collaborations with choreographers and dancers. They produced three large installations, all focusing on dance and queer temporalities in various ways. Starting with the feeling of being pushed backwards by political backlashes, Moving Backwards (2019) explores resistance practices, combining postmodern choreography and urban dance with guerrilla techniques and elements of queer underground culture. The conceptual camera relentlessly moves from right to left, and left to right at the same speed. Some walks, solos, and group dances are carried out backwards, while others are digitally reversed, raising doubt about their spatial and temporal directions. In (No) Time (2020), performed by four dancers, extreme slowness, moving in circles, being out of synch, breaks, or stillness disrupt normalized conceptions of time. Les Gayrillères (2022) connects the concept of opacity to dance movements. The camera moves in a full circle, following a continuous dance by six performers, who control their degrees of visibility by employing small lights fixed to their costumes. Time and again, their bodies disappear from view, either because being too dark or too bright.

=== Collaborations with Chelsea Manning ===
In I Want they stage a meeting between punk poet Kathy Acker, artist Sharon Hayes, and transgender- and prison-abolitionist activist Chelsea Manning, who, in 2010, channeled classified information about the war in Iraq to WikiLeaks. I Want (2015) shows a performance by artist Sharon Hayes, filmed in one take but with two cameras, creating a two channel installation with slightly different shots. The text is a collage of Kathy Acker's and Chelsea Manning’s writings. In this installation, Acker’s poetic strategies of appropriating and recombining text fragments, as well as switching identities, provoke a rereading of Manning’s public disclosures. In 2025, a few years after Manning’s release, Boudry & Lorenz invited her to play a DJ set in the legendary queer club SchwutZ in Berlin. They created the film installation All The Things She Said(2025), showing her DJ set in the vast empty club, accompanied by a short conversation on a second screen. As in most of their films, sound is recorded in great detail and with attention. They used multiple microphones throughout the club, enabling the viewer to listen to the DJ-desk, along Manning's headphones, from backstage, from the disco ball ‘s angle, or from the perspective of the dancefloor. The sounddesign by composer and producer Rashad Becker highlights the importance of each sonic perspective for the collective experience of listening, dancing, and celebrating.

=== Opacity and Echoes: interventions in historical architectures ===
In 2022, Boudry & Lorenz created Glass Is My Skin, an installation made of mirroring stages and smoke in the Crystal Palace Madrid/ Museo Reina Sofía, a colonial building entirely made of glass. The work engages with the building’s transparency. The artists describe this transparency as visually embodying the intention to better understand and control the colonies. Several times a day, the entire space was slowly rendered opaque by a choreography of smoke, while a musical piece by Aéréa Negrot resonated throughout this transformed environment.

In 2025, for You Ask Me To Not Give Up, Up, Up, they transformed the Bellelay Abbey in Jura, Switzerland, by constructing a wooden structure resembling a roller coaster in the main nave. The structure carried a speaker that played a sound composition by Colin Self that explores the resonances of the architecture. Leaning on Gayatri Chakravorty Spivak’s thinking, the echo is shown as a ghost.

== Selected Exhibitions ==
Boudry & Lorenz have shown their work at Instituto Svizzero, Rome (2025); Muac Mexico (2025); Leeum Museum of Art Seoul (2024), Philadelphia Museum of Art (2024, 2025); 35th São Paulo Biennial (2024); Centre Pompidou Paris (2021, 2023); Korean Museum of Art (2023); Van Abbemuseum Eindhoven (2023); Palacio de Cristal, Museo Reina Sofía, Madrid – Reina Sofia (2022); Whitechapel Gallery, London (2022); Hammer Museum Los Angeles (2021); KunstRaum Innsbruck (2021); Seoul Museum of Art (2021); Julia Stoshek Collection Berlin (2019); New Museum New York (2017); Centre Culturel Suisse, Paris, (2018); New Museum, New York (2017); Contemporary Arts Museum Houston (2017);Participant Inc., New York, (2017); Kunsthalle Wien, Vienna, (2015); Nottingham Contemporary (2015); Kunsthalle Zürich, Zürich, (2015); CAPC, musée d’art contemporain de Bordeaux, 2013; Badischer Kunstverein, Karlsruhe (2013); South London Gallery (2012); Centre d'Art Contemporain Genève, (2011), and Les Complices*, Zürich ( 2008, 2009, 2010, 2013). In 2019 Pauline Boudry / Renate Lorenz were invited to represent Switzerland at the 58th Venice Biennale. In 2022 and 2023, the duo's installation "El cristal es mi piel" was featured in Madrid's Palacio de Cristal.

== Selected Publications ==
- 2014: Aftershow, texts by Pauline Boudry, Renate Lorenz, Sternberg Press, ISBN 978-3-95679-049-2
- 2016: I Want, texts by Gregg Bordowitz, Laura Guy, Dean Spade, Craig Willse, Sternberg Press, ISBN 978-3-95679-235-9
- 2018: Telepathic Improvisation, texts by André Lepecki, Mason Leaver-Yap, Alhena Katsof, Victoria Brooks; interview with Dean Daderko, Lia Gangitano, Contemporary Arts Museum Houston, ISBN 978-1-933619-68-2
- 2019: Moving Backwards, texts by André Lepecki and Charlotte Laubard, letters, among others, by Fouzia Al-Youssef, Judith Butler, Patrisse Cullors, Mirkan Deniz, Nikita Dhawan, Treva Ellison, Antke Engel, Azar Mahmoudian, Eve Tuck, Françoise Vergès, Skira, ISBN 978-88-572-4114-2
- 2022: Stages, texts by Elisabeth Lebovici, Amelia Groom, Ana Janevski, Irene Revell, Mason Leaver-Yap, Mayra A. Rodríguez Castro, Miguel A. López, Pablo Lafuente, Rindon Johnson, Yolande Zola Zoll van der Heide. Edited by Övül Ö. Durmuşoğlu, Spector Books, ISBN 978-3-95905-612-0
- 2025: Todo lo que ella dijo – All the Things She Said (2025), text by Alejandra Labastida, MUAC – UNAM, Mexico City, ISBN 978-607-587-378-7

== Weblinks ==
- Artists Webpage
- Renate Lorenz at Library of Congress
- Pauline Boudry at Library of Congress
