= Aldo Crivelli =

Swiss archaeologist (1907–1981)

- Crivelli in the 1970s
- Born: 18 June 1907; Chiasso, Switzerland
- Died: 12 July 1981 (aged 74); Locarno, Switzerland
- Other names: Lallo Vicredi; Settebello; Gavroche
- Occupations: Teacher; archaeologist; painter; journalist
- Spouse: Virginia Pisenti

Aldo Crivelli (18 June 1907 – 12 July 1981) was a Swiss archaeologist, teacher, painter, and journalist from Ticino. In 1943 he published the first synthesis of the finds made in Ticino, and from 1944 to 1961 he was the cantonal inspector of museums and excavations.

== Biography ==
Aldo Crivelli was the son of Bernardino Crivelli and Angioletta née Pellini. He married Virginia Pisenti. After graduating from the teachers' college (scuola magistrale) in Locarno in 1929, he taught at the cantonal schools for apprentices until 1944.

Trained as an archaeologist in the field, Crivelli published in 1943 the Atlante preistorico e storico della Svizzera italiana (Prehistoric and historical atlas of Italian-speaking Switzerland), the first synthesis of the finds made in Ticino. He was cantonal inspector of museums and excavations from 1944 to 1961 and inspector of monuments from 1958, and he promoted numerous explorations of the prehistoric and Roman necropolises of the Locarnese, the Leventina, and the Bellinzonese.

He founded the Rivista storica ticinese (1938–1946) and published his contributions under the anagram "Lallo Vicredi". Himself a painter, he also studied the emigration of artists (Architetti Beretta da Brissago, 1934; Artisti ticinesi, 4 vols., 1966–1971). In his last years he was active as a polemical journalist, publishing his articles in Il Paese under the pseudonym "Settebello" and in the Gazzetta Ticinese under the pseudonym "Gavroche". According to a list published in 1936, he was one of the five members from Ticino of the Groupe romand de Saint-Luc.

== Works ==
- Atlante preistorico e storico della Svizzera italiana, 1943 (reprint 1990, with a contribution by P. Donati)

== Bibliography ==
- P. Donati, "Aldo Crivelli", in Rivista archeologica dell'antica provincia e diocesi di Como, 164, 1982, 299–300
