= Poncet (surname) =

Poncet is a French surname. Notable people with the surname include:

- André Poncet (1755–1838), French general during the French Revolutionary Wars
- André François-Poncet (1887–1978), French diplomat
- Antonin Poncet (1849–1913), French surgeon
- Charles Poncet de Brétigny (c. 1610–1644), governor of the colony of Cayenne in what is now French Guiana
- Dan Poncet (born 1953), French painter
- Jean François-Poncet (1928–2012), French politician and son of André François-Poncet
- Joseph Poncet (1610–1675), French Jesuit missionary to Canada
- Marcel Poncet (1894–1953), Swiss stained-glass artist and painter
- Michel Poncet de La Rivière (1671–1730), French bishop of Angers and cousin of Joseph
- Michelle Poncet (1720–1784), French actress
- Sally Poncet (born 1954), Australian-born Antarctic scientist
