= Émile Chambon =

Swiss painter and illustrator

Émile François Chambon
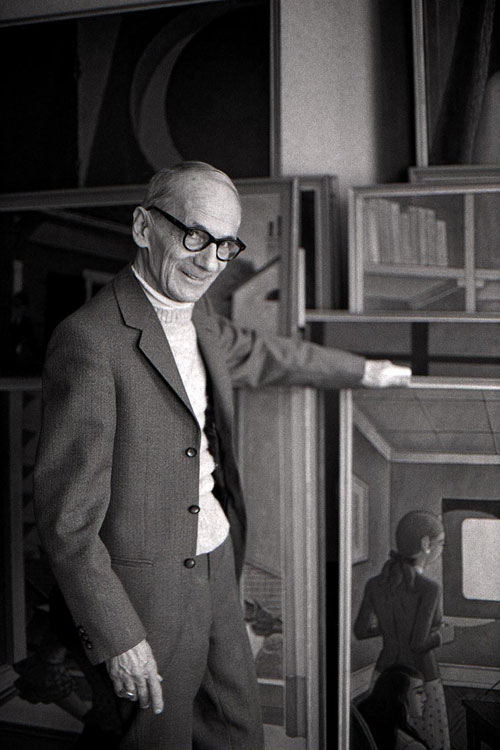
- Born: 10 January 1905; Geneva, Switzerland
- Died: 28 October 1993 (aged 88); Collonge-Bellerive, Switzerland
- Known for: Painting

Émile François Chambon (10 January 1905 – 28 October 1993) was a Swiss painter and illustrator.

== Biography ==
=== Early years (1905–1928) ===
Émile Chambon was born in Geneva, the son of Émile-Joseph Chambon and Joséphine née Coppier. Three years after Émile, his mother gave birth to a daughter, Julia Mathilde Chambon, who went on to assist Émile throughout her life, following and supporting him, carefully noting in her diary the agenda and activities of her brother up until his death in October 1993.

In the autumn of 1921, Chambon entered the École des Beaux-Arts de Genève. A first federal grant was awarded to him that year and enabled him to undertake a journey to Paris. This stay allowed him to become familiar with the Cubist painters, who did not however find favour in his eyes – apart from Roger de La Fresnaye – as, in his opinion, they simply imitated African art without being able to render the latter's originality. During the period from 1925 to 1928, he worked with the painter Jean-Louis Gampert, La Fresnaye's friend; he assisted him in his atelier and also in the realisation of the decor for the Corsier church (Geneva).

=== Recognition and fulfillment (1928–1950) ===
In 1928 he received a second federal grant that allowed him a second journey to Paris; he stayed there for almost ten weeks. He discovered the Musée du Louvre where he made numerous copies, essentially in the form of drawings, from Rembrandt, Rubens and Géricault. He also visited the Musée Guimet, Petit-Palais and the great monuments of Paris. The end of the 1930s saw a remarkable increase in Chambon's output of canvases. He almost doubled his level of production compared to the beginning of the decade; this rhythm remained steady until the end of the 1960s. Chambon's father died in February 1946 and his passing severely affected Emile's health; he had always maintained a very strong relationship with his father and would only partially recover from this loss.

=== Maturity (1950–1979) ===
From the beginning of the 1950s, Chambon's oeuvre became increasingly popular in Switzerland; Chambon exhibited at a considerable number of collective exhibitions, most of which were in the German part of Switzerland. The publication, in December 1957, of a first monograph on Chambon, further contributed to more fully establishing his artistic reputation. The monograph was written by Edouard Muller-Moor and published by Editions Cailler in their 'Painters and Sculptors of Yesterday and Today' collection.

In 1961 in Geneva, he met, through one of their mutual friends, the writer Louise de Vilmorin, who immediately admired the artist's work and took a liking to him. On 10 May 1962, at De Vilmorin's instigation, the vernissage of a major Chambon exhibition took place at the Galerie Motte in Paris. De Vilmorin also wrote the laudatory preface in the accompanying catalogue presenting the works.

1965 firmly established the painter and his collection, for he participated in the Künstler, Sammler exhibition at Aargauer Kunsthaus, along with a new collective presentation of works by Swiss artists entitled Pittura Contemporanea Svizzera at the villa Olma on the banks of Lake Como.

From 1977 on, Chambon's output of paintings diminished and he mainly dedicated himself to drawing. He also had a few health problems and was not able, to his great regret, to attend the vernissage of the major Courbet retrospective organised in July at the Musée d'Ornans on the occasion of the fiftieth anniversary of the painter's death.

=== Towards posterity (1979–1993) ===
In the later years of his life, Chambon's thoughts were mainly taken up with the perpetuation of his oeuvre. In February 1980 he met the director of the future Carouge Museum with a view to a donation that he wished to make to the institution. Two years later, the painter donated eight large paintings to the museum. Meanwhile, in October 1981, he gave away a large part of his collections – nearly eight hundred pieces of African and Oceanic art - to the Ethnographic Museum in Geneva. During this period, Chambon retouched or reworked some works that he had done several decades earlier, deeming them unfinished.

The Foundation Emile Chambon finally came into being two years after Emile Chambon's death on 28 October 1993 at Collonge-Bellerive.

== Works in public institutions ==
- La Blouse blanche, 1926, Musée d’Art et d’Histoire, Fribourg
- Le Peintre et son modèle, 1934, Musée d’Art et d’Histoire, Fribourg
- Prise du drapeau du « Front National » par la police de Léon Nicole, le 1er juin 1935, 1935, Musée d’Art et d’Histoire, Geneva
- L'Enterrement de première classe, 1938, Kunsthaus Zurich, Zurich
- Femme à la toilette (Orientale), 1941, Musée d’Art et d’Histoire, Neuchâtel
- L’Eau, le Gaz et l’Électricité, 1943, Services industriels de Genève, usine de Verbois (Geneva)
- La Maison du pasteur, 1945, Musée d’Art et d’Histoire, Geneva
- La Charité, 1946, Vitromusée, Romont
- La Cheminée, 1948-1964, Cantonal Museum of Fine Arts, Lausanne
- Le Salon de Cologny, 1948-1964, Musée d’Art et d’Histoire, Geneva
- Jeune fille au narcisse, 1949, Kunstmuseum Winterthur, Winterthur
- Conversation (le couple), 1950, Primavera Gallery, New York
- Le Cauchemar, 1950, Primavera Gallery, New York
- Hommage à Courbet, 1952, Aargauer Kunsthaus, Aarau
- L’Indiscret, 1956, Primavera Gallery, New York
- La Justice, 1957, tapisserie réalisée d’après un carton d’Emile Chambon, Fonds cantonal d’art contemporain, Geneva
- Jeune fille aux mouettes (Marina Doria), 1957-1961, Musée de Carouge
- Harpe du Soudan, 1960, Aargauer Kunsthaus, Aarau
- Pygmalion, 1961, Musée d’Art et d’Histoire, Geneva
- Psyché et l’Amour, 1962, Musée d’Art et d’Histoire, Geneva
- Jeune fille aux pensées, 1966, Fonds cantonal d’art contemporain, Geneva
