= Augustin Meinrad Bächtiger =

Swiss painter (1888–1971)

- Born: 12 May 1888; Mörschwil, Switzerland
- Died: 4 May 1971 (aged 82); Gossau, St. Gallen, Switzerland
- Education: Academy of Fine Arts, Munich
- Known for: Religious painting

Augustin Meinrad Bächtiger ([aʊ̯ɡʊsˈtiːn ˈbɛçˌtiːɡɐ]; 12 May 1888 – 4 May 1971) was a Swiss painter, graphic artist and illustrator, particularly known for his religious paintings. He trained at the Academy of Fine Arts in Munich and received numerous church commissions during the 1920s and 1930s. His principal work was a series of 28 murals for the cemetery hall in Hochdorf, completed in two phases between 1933 and 1945.

== Biography ==
Augustin Meinrad Bächtiger was born on 12 May 1888 in Mörschwil. He grew up at the Thurhof boys' institution in Oberbüren, which his father directed. Bächtiger attended the Gewerbeschule in St. Gallen in 1903, followed by a traineeship with the decorative painting firm Berli & Thermann the following year.

Art historian Adolf Fäh helped Bächtiger secure a place at the Academy of Fine Arts in Munich. During his time in the city from 1905 to 1910, he studied under Angelo Jank and Peter von Halm. In 1908, Bächtiger also worked at Wilhelm von Debschitz's studio.

In 1910, Bächtiger undertook a study trip to Italy. In 1912, he won first prize in the poster competition for the Eidgenössisches Sängerfest in Neuchâtel. The following year, he received another first prize for his design of the official Swiss National Day postcard. He spent time with Franz von Stuck in Munich in 1915. Bächtiger returned to Oberbüren in 1916. In 1917, Bächtiger began active military service with a mountain company in the Engadin. That year, he was also included in the Schweizerisches Künstler-Lexikon.

From 1919 to 1921, Bächtiger stayed in Samedan in the Engadin. Further study trips took him to France in 1921–1922 and Spain in 1922 and 1926. He moved to Gossau in 1923. The following year, he became a founding member of the German-speaking Swiss section of the artists' association Societas Sancti Lucae. In 1930, he married Christine Helfenberger, with whom he had three children. Bächtiger built a house with an artist's studio in the Sonnenbühl area of Gossau. He died in Gossau on 4 May 1971. In July 2026, Gossau renamed Lindenplatz Bächtiger-Platz in his honour.

== Work ==
Bächtiger's work at the Trinity Chapel in Dietfurt (1933)

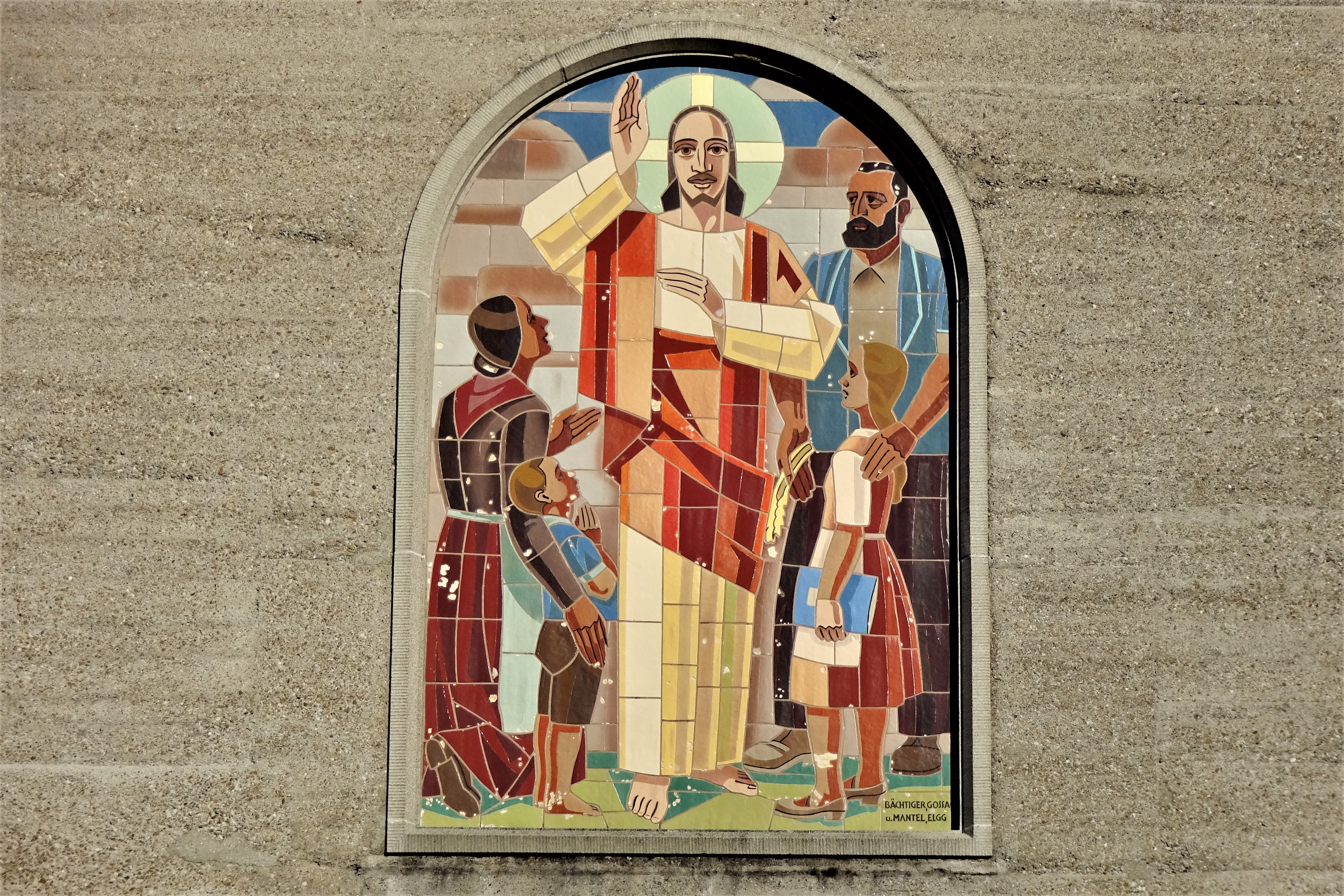
Bächtiger's mosaic at the parish church in Wünnewil (1937)

Bächtiger was a painter and graphic artist whose work included religious murals, altarpieces and stained-glass windows. In 1910, he painted his first altarpieces, two works for St. Otmar's Church in St. Gallen. His reputation as a church painter grew following a commission for a ceiling painting in the parish church at Mels in 1922. Bächtiger's early graphic work included posters, postcards and Swiss wartime graphics.

From 1923, Bächtiger undertook larger church commissions, including ceiling paintings depicting the life of Saint Gall in Amden (1923). In 1925, he painted the ceilings of St. Gallus's Church in Libingen. His ceiling painting depicting the Last Judgement in St. Andrew's Church in Gossau followed in 1928.

Bächtiger's work for the Trinity Chapel in Dietfurt (1933) included altar murals, Stations of the Cross and stained-glass windows. In 1934, Bächtiger was commissioned to paint three altar murals for the pilgrimage church of St. Iddaburg near Gähwil. The following year, he painted three altar murals for St. Joseph's Church in Ricken, none of which survive.

In 1937, Bächtiger designed the ceramic mosaic Christus segnet die Familie for the parish church in Wünnewil. Between 1938 and 1940, Bächtiger painted a mural in the choir of St. Sebastian's Church in Henau. His work in Gossau also included 18 stained-glass windows that were once displayed in the courtroom of the Amtshaus.

The murals in Hochdorf's cemetery hall are considered Bächtiger's principal work. The series comprises 28 paintings on the themes of the Dies irae and the Apocalypse, executed in 1933–1936 and 1942–1945.

Bächtiger sought to modernise religious painting while retaining a figurative approach. He favoured carefully structured compositions and intensified colours and forms, while remaining relatively faithful to natural appearances. In his biblical scenes, he portrayed figures in contemporary clothing against familiar local mountain landscapes.

Bächtiger's religious art divided opinion: church patrons often found him too modern, whereas art critics associated him with an earlier era. His heroic figures attracted particular criticism after the Second World War, and some were removed. With fewer public church commissions after the Second World War, Bächtiger increasingly undertook private commissions and pursued his own painting. His final major commission for a religious work was completed in Altdorf in 1966.

Beyond his religious commissions, Bächtiger produced landscapes, nudes and still lifes. Between 1915 and 1923, he produced illustrations for St. Gallen schoolbooks. His book illustrations included Gustav Wiget's Schweizergeschichte (1921) and Arnold Büchli's Sagen von Graubünden (1933 and 1935). Unlike his religious murals and altarpieces, his watercolours and easel paintings featured a more spontaneous approach and post-Impressionist forms and colours.
