= Hans Aeschbacher =

Swiss sculptor (1906–1980)

- Born: 18 January 1906; Zurich, Switzerland
- Died: 27 January 1980 (aged 74); Uster, Switzerland
- Known for: Sculpture
- Notable work: Abstract Faces (1945), Explorer I (1964)

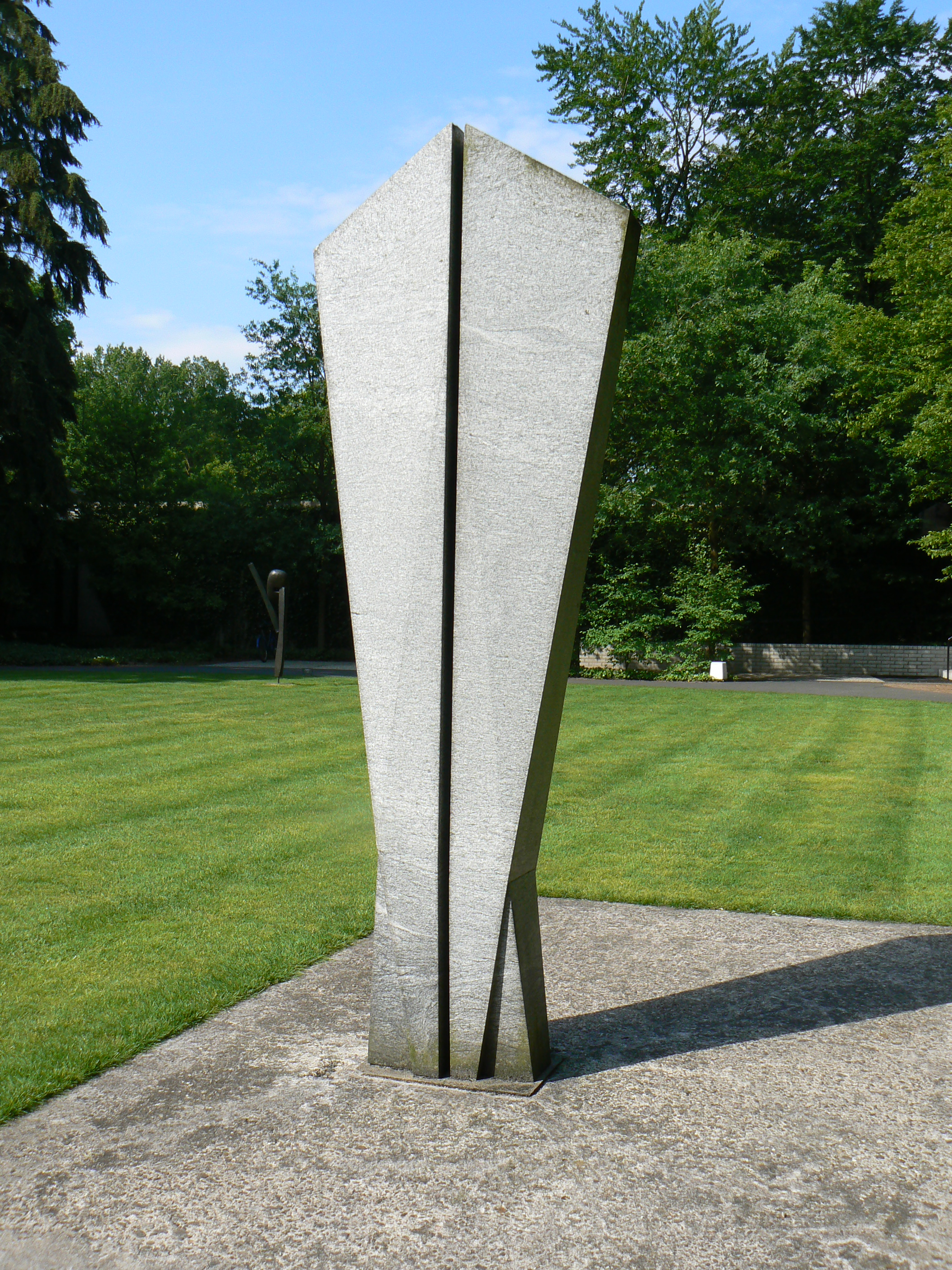
Grosse Figur I (1961)

Hans Aeschbacher (18 January 1906 – 27 January 1980) was a Swiss abstract sculptor. After an unfinished apprenticeship as a printer, he qualified as a master stucco plasterer and taught himself to draw and paint before turning to sculpture in the 1930s. His work developed from figurative pieces in plaster and terra-cotta to monumental abstract stone forms, with public sculptures installed in Switzerland and internationally.

== Biography ==
Hans Aeschbacher was born on 18 January 1906 in Zurich, the son of Johann, a mechanic, and grew up in the city's industrial quarter. After completing compulsory schooling, he trained as a printer but did not finish the apprenticeship. In 1926 he traveled to Rome and Florence, where he drew monuments and figure studies. Returning to Zurich, he qualified as a master plasterer while continuing to draw and paint in his free time.

Aeschbacher created his first sculptural works in 1934. Between 1939 and 1941 he received a Swiss federal art scholarship, and around this time developed friendships with the artist Hans Fischli and the patron Willi Blattmann. In 1947 he won the Conrad Ferdinand Meyer Prize with the granite sculpture Züka-Stier, and married his second wife, Rose Aimée Cuendet. From 1947 to 1964 he lived in Six-Fours-la-Plage in southern France, where he created many of his major sculptures.

In 1956 he married his third wife, Maja Ingeborg Friemuth, with whom he had three daughters. The family settled in Russikon, in the Zurich Oberland, in 1965. Aeschbacher was awarded the Hans Arp Prize in 1966, the honorary gift of the Canton of Zurich in 1973, and the Art Prize of the City of Zurich in 1977. He died on 27 January 1980 in Uster.

== Work ==
Aeschbacher's earliest pieces, created in the 1930s, were figurative works in plaster and terra-cotta, but by 1945 he was working primarily in stone. His style developed toward abstract and geometrical forms, often monumental in scale. In the mid-1950s he began using volcanic rock, which gave his sculptures a more fluid quality, though by the late 1950s he returned to large, angular forms, some reaching 4.5 metres in height. Among his public works is Explorer I (1964) at Zurich Airport, along with sculptures installed in Zurich, Winterthur, Bern, Otterlo, and Hakone.

== Selected exhibitions ==
- 1944 – Kunsthaus Zürich, first participation in an exhibition
- 1952 – Helmhaus Zürich, with paintings by Hans Fischli
- 1956 – Venice Biennale
- 1959 – documenta 2, Kassel
- 1961 – Kunsthalle Bern, first major solo exhibition, curated by Harald Szeemann
- 1964 – Venice Biennale
- 1964 – documenta 3, Kassel
- 1972 – Strauhof Zürich, retrospective of drawings (1924–1971)
- 1985 – Kunsthaus Zürich, major retrospective
- 1986 – Mendrisio, continuation of the Zürich retrospective

== See also ==
- Modernism
- Swiss art
