= Arnold Stockmann =

Swiss goldsmith (1882–1963)

- Born: 12 September 1882; Sarnen, Switzerland
- Died: 12 June 1963 (aged 80); Lucerne, Switzerland
- Occupations: Goldsmith; silversmith
- Spouse: Maria Lötscher (m. 1910)

Arnold Stockmann (12 September 1882 – 12 June 1963) was a Swiss goldsmith and silversmith in Lucerne. He was a co-founder of the Swiss St. Luke Society in 1924 and contributed to the renewal of religious arts and crafts in Switzerland.

== Biography ==
Arnold Stockmann was the son of Alois Stockmann, a drum instructor and career officer, and Albertina née Imfeld. In 1910 he married Maria Lötscher, daughter of Anton, a shoemaker. From 1900 to 1907 he trained as a chaser and draftsman in Lucerne, with additional training as a medalist. He had his own workshop in Lucerne.

From 1921 Stockmann devoted himself mainly to religious gold and silver work, and from about 1937 to secular work. He also made repoussé work in bronze, as well as designs, for example for the banners of associations. He trained noted silversmiths and artisans. He was a member of the Swiss Werkbund and in 1924 a co-founder of the Swiss St. Luke Society (Schweizerische St. Lukasgesellschaft). Building on the historical repertoire of styles, Stockmann increasingly incorporated contemporary currents into his work and simplified the forms of his pictorial representations. In this way he contributed to the renewal of religious arts and crafts in Switzerland.

== Bibliography ==
- Künstler-Lexikon der Schweiz, XX. Jahrhundert, 2 vols., 1958–1967, 944
- A. Zeier, Der Luzerner Goldschmied Arnold Stockmann, master's thesis, Freiburg im Breisgau, 1991

=== Archives ===
- Papers, Historisches Museum Luzern, Lucerne
