= Abraham Hermanjat =

Swiss painter (1862–1932)

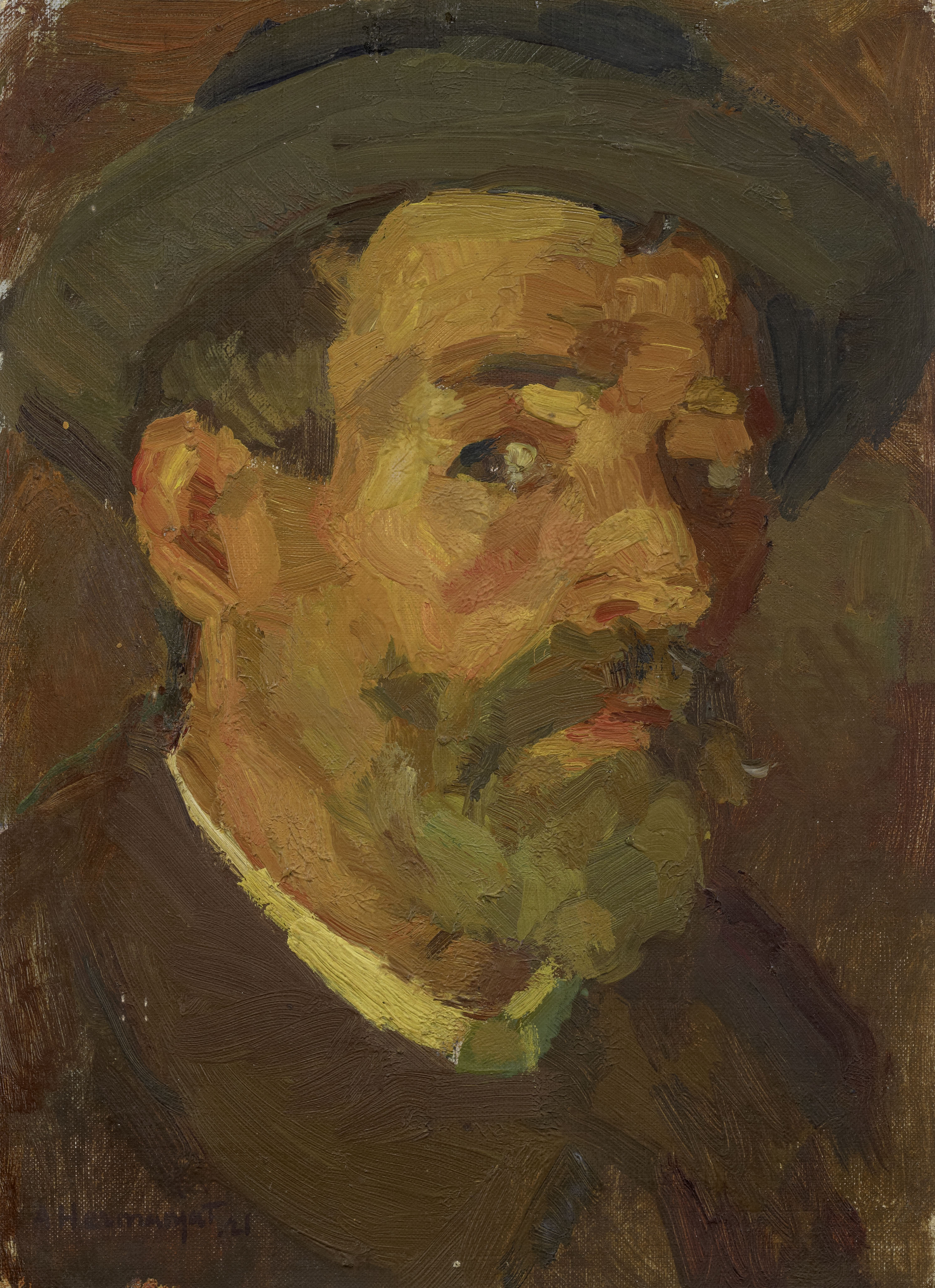
Self-portrait (1921)

Jacques-Elie-Abraham Hermanjat (29 September 1862, Geneva - 12 October 1932, Aubonne) was a Swiss painter who worked primarily in the Fauvist and Divisionist styles and was one of the first Swiss artists to draw on the work of Paul Cézanne. He was also involved in cultural politics.

== Biography ==
After attending the public schools of Geneva, he studied art with Barthélemy Menn and Auguste Baud-Bovy. In 1886, he went to Algiers, to join his mother and brother after his father's death. He stayed until 1888 and returned on two other occasions; 1889-1890 and 1893-1896. During these visits, he developed an interest in Orientalism, a genre which was already in favor with some of his compatriots, including Charles Gleyre and Auguste Veillon. His paintings there were executed in the traditional styles he had learned in Geneva.

In 1896 Hermanjat, then married, returned with his wife Marie Louise, née Zénobel (1855–1955), to Switzerland and initially settled in Lausanne. In 1908, they moved to Aubonne. By 1911, he had built a cottage there, where he lived until his death. He soon abandoned Orientalism and turned to landscapes, spending much of his time in the mountains; primarily near Aigle, although he also visited Valais, Nendaz, Haute-Nendaz and Verbier. His paintings from this period owe much to the influence of Giovanni Segantini.

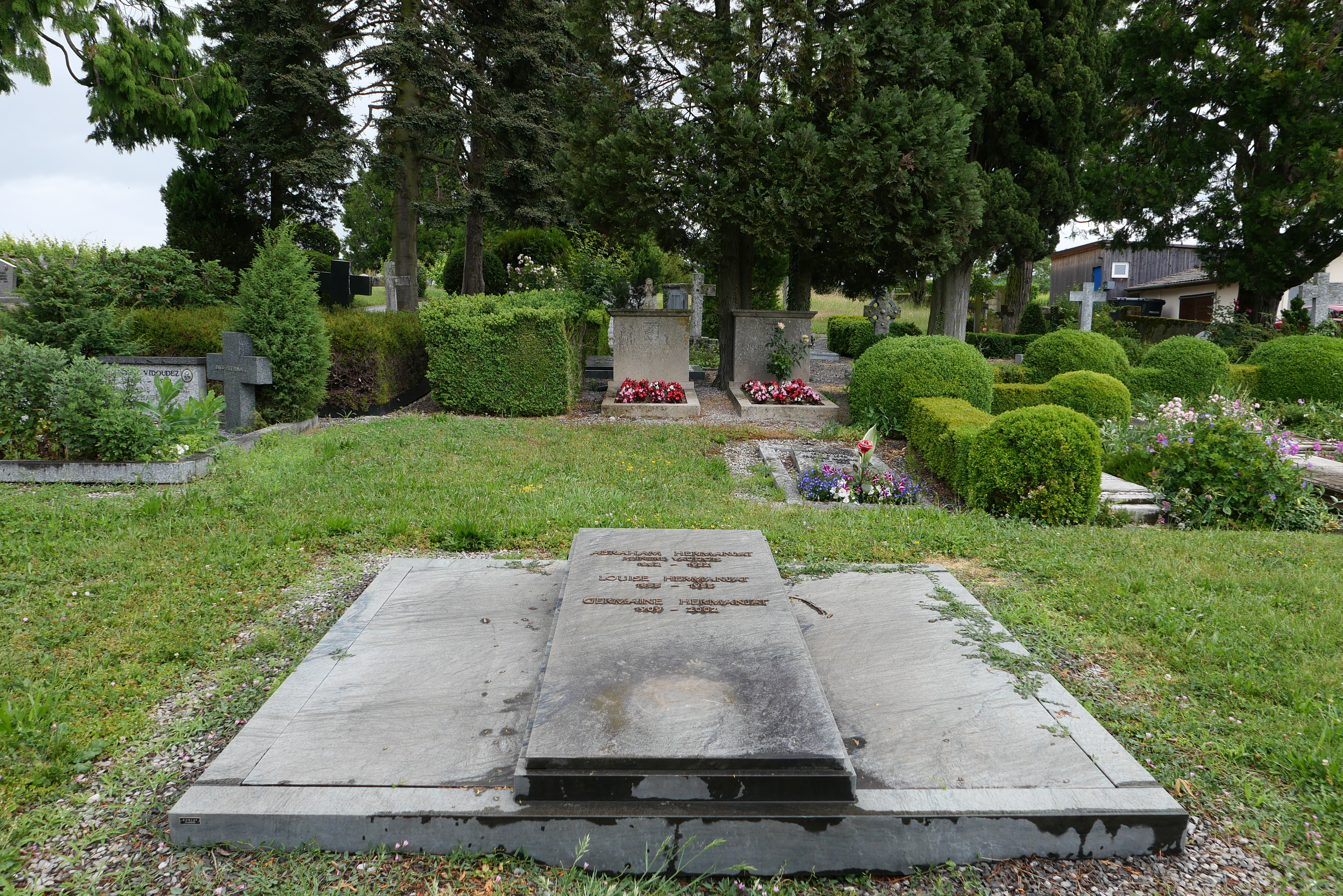
The grave of Hermanjat, his wife and their adoptive daughter at the cemetery of Aubonne

During the years 1908 to 1912, he became attracted to Fauvism and began applying non-natural colors to his landscapes. In 1910, following genealogical research, he began spelling his name "Hermanjat", rather than "Hermenjat" as he had previously. It was also at this time that he made the acquaintance of Ferdinand Hodler and was influenced by Symbolism. Over the next decade, however, Cézanne would supplant Hodler as his primary inspiration.

From 1910 to 1928, he was a member of the Central Committee of the Society of Swiss Painters, Sculptors and Architects (SPSAS). He also served on the Federal Commission for Fine Arts from 1922 to 1925. This was in addition to several teaching positions and jury service for art competitions.

His adopted daughter, Germaine Hermanjat (1909-2002), started out to be a painter but devoted herself to the promotion of his works. In 2003, following her death, money she had bequeathed to the city of Nyon was used to create the Abraham Hermanjat Foundation. In 2012, the Musée historique et des porcelaines de Nyon, the Musée du Léman and the foundation joined, on the occasion of his 150th anniversary, to present the first major showing of his works in over thirty years.

== Selected paintings ==
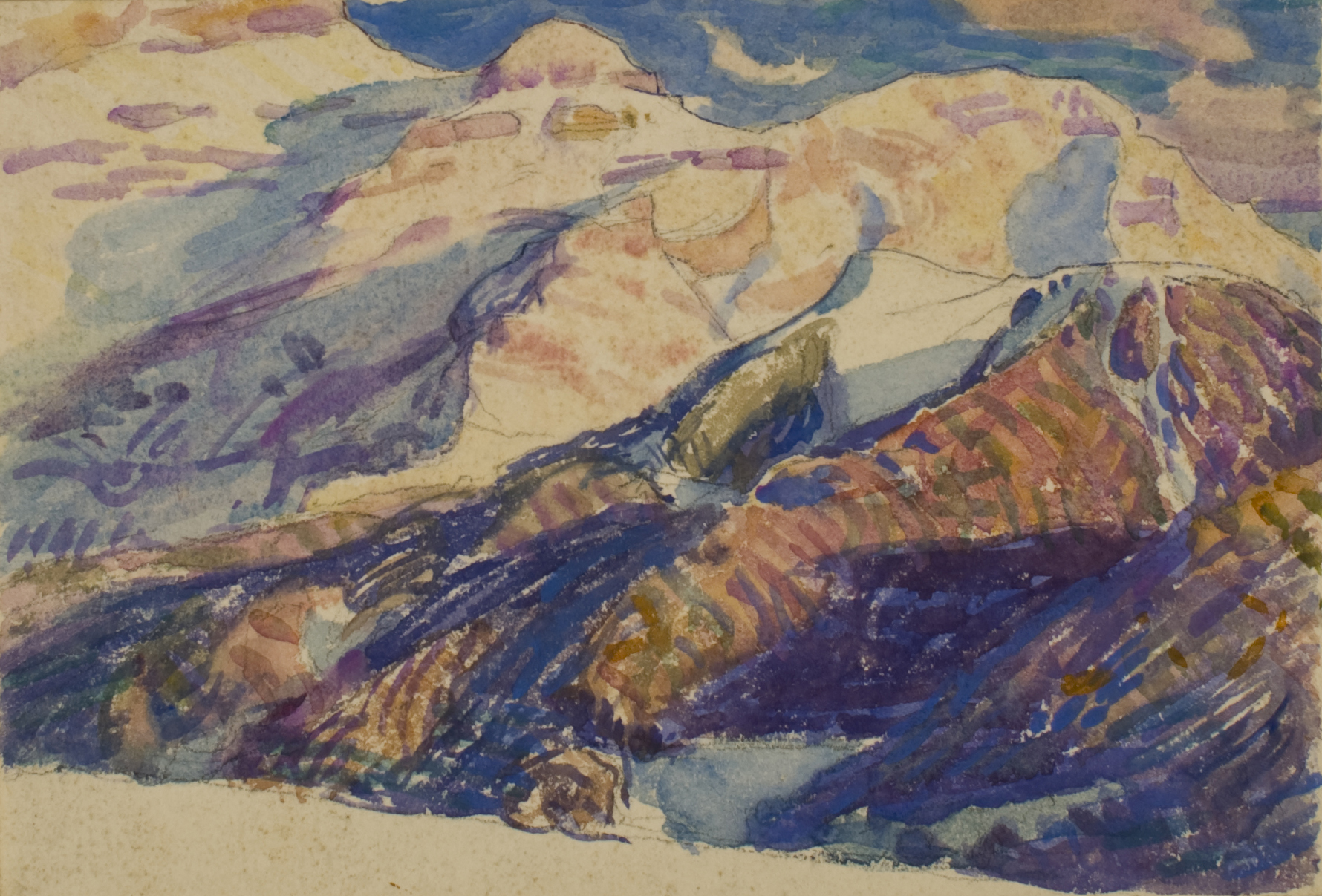
Montagnes enneigées (Snowy Mountains)

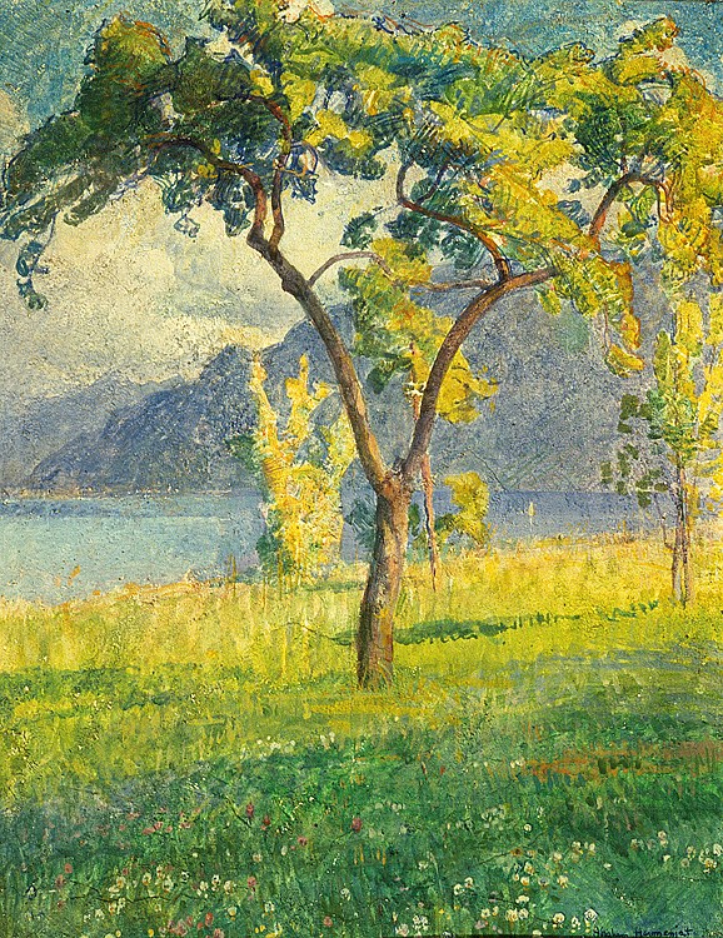
Mon verger
(My Orchard), 1905

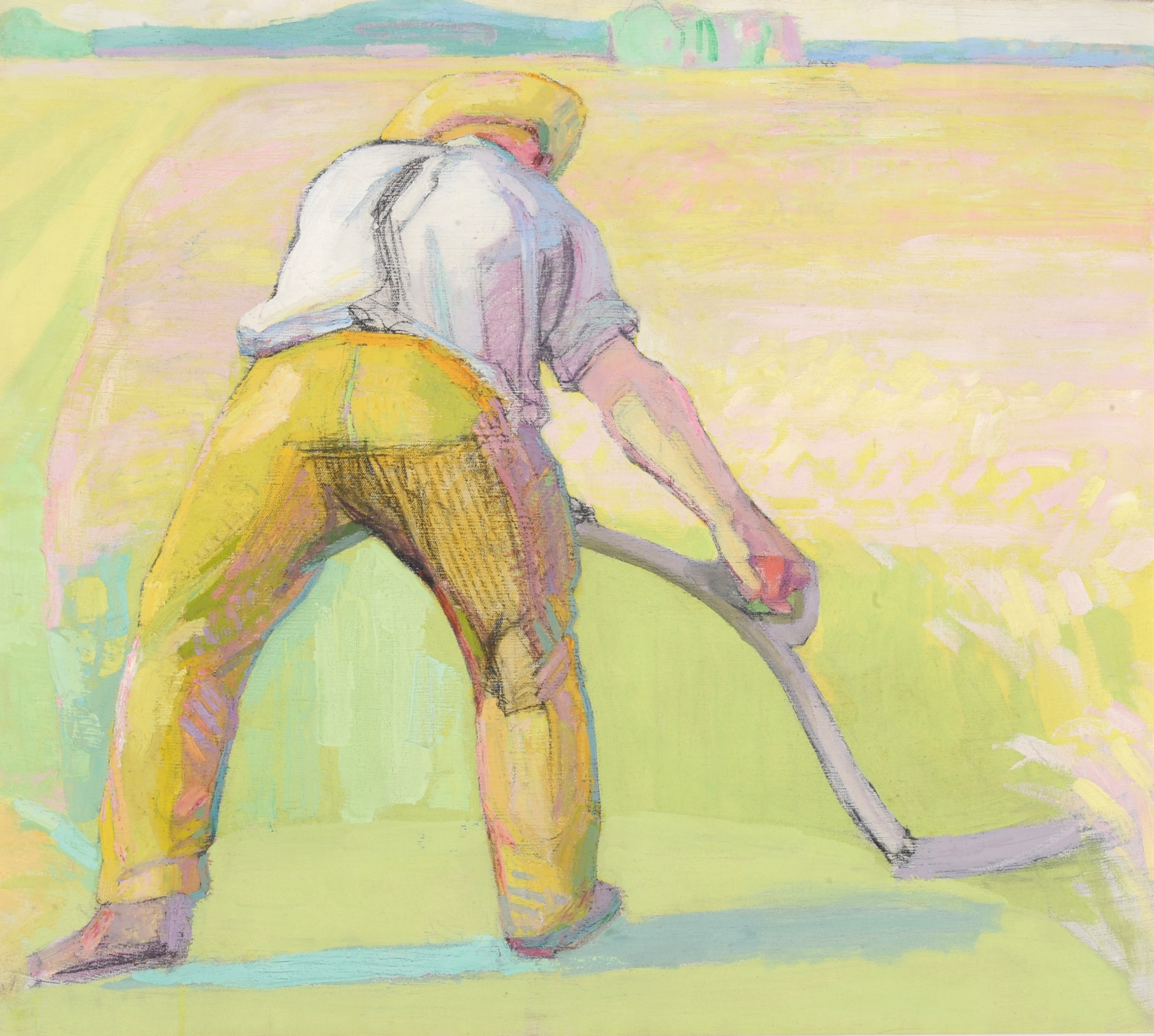
Faucheur de dos
(Rear View of a Reaper)

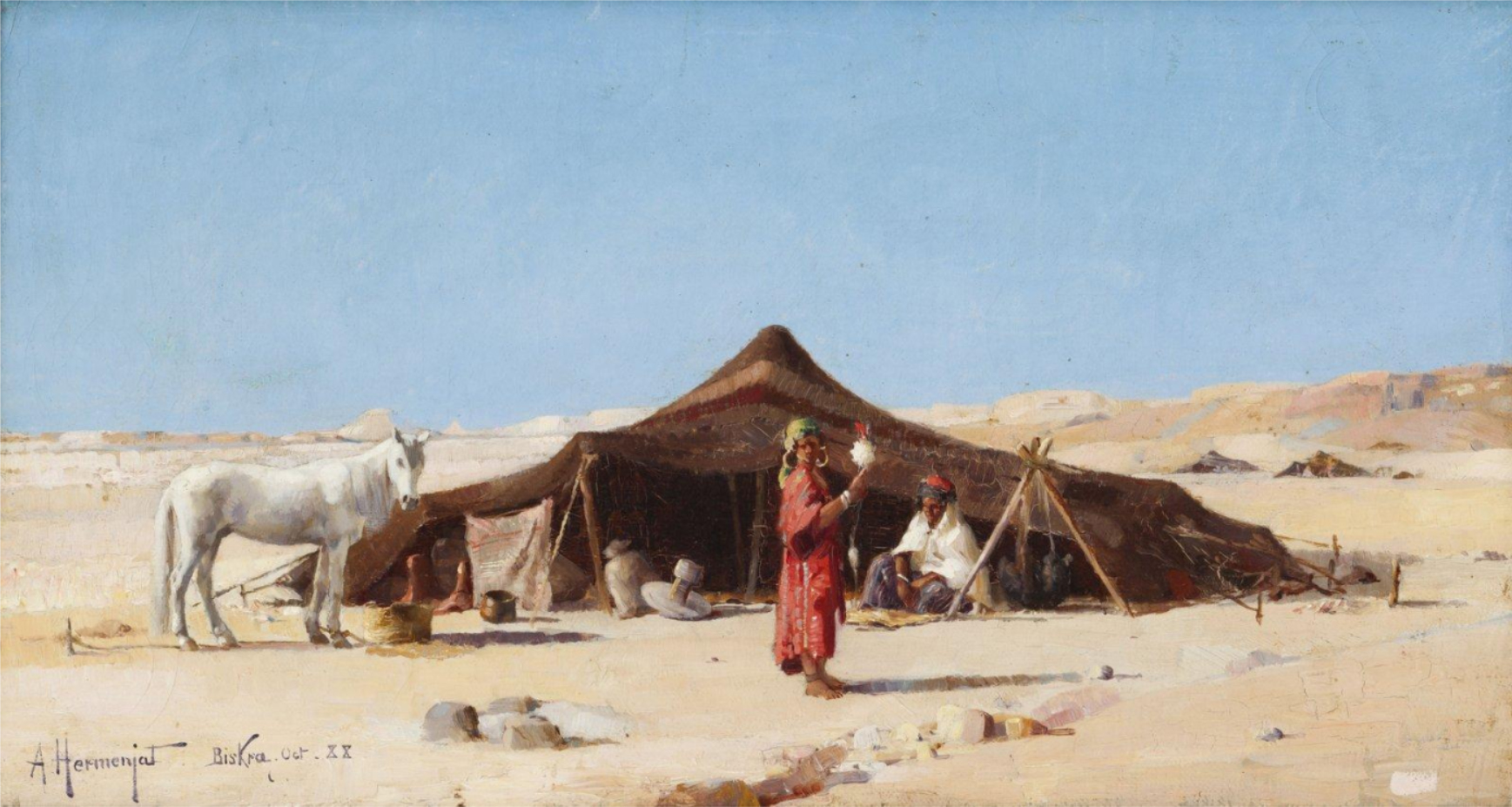
Campement à Biskra (Camp Near Biskra), ca. 1920

== Sources ==
- Langer, Laurent; Bron-Pache, Rosemonde; Rossellat, Daniel; Givel, Jean-Claude; Jaunin, Françoise; Peltre, Christine; Lieber, Vincent; Beltinger, Karoline; Wittwer, Hans-Peter; Beltinger, Carinne; Jean-Petit-Matile, Maurice (2012). Abraham Hermanjat 1862-1932: De l'Orient au Léman (cat. exp., Nyon, Musée historique et des porcelaines, château de Nyon et Musée du Léman. Nyon, Fondation Abraham Hermanjat). Berne: Benteli. ISBN 978-3716517215.
