= Marcel Poncet =

Swiss stained-glass artist (1894–1953)

- Self-Portrait with Top Hat, 1928
- Born: 29 January 1894; Geneva, Switzerland
- Died: 18 June 1953 (aged 59); Lausanne, Switzerland
- Education: École des Beaux-Arts, Geneva
- Spouse: Anne-Marie Denis (m. 1922)

Marcel Poncet (29 January 1894 – 18 June 1953) was a Swiss artist who made stained glass, mosaics, and paintings. He was one of the most important representatives of modern sacred art in French-speaking Switzerland.

== Biography ==
Marcel Poncet was the son of Auguste Poncet, owner of a heating business, and Emma née Guilland. In 1922 he married Anne-Marie Denis, daughter of the painter Maurice Denis, with whom Poncet often worked.

In 1910 Poncet entered the School of Fine Arts (École des Beaux-Arts) in Geneva, and he then trained as a glass painter in Carouge. In 1915 he opened his own studio in Geneva. In 1919 he and Alexandre Cingria founded the Groupe de Saint-Luc et Saint-Maurice in Geneva, a cooperative (1919–1924) from which the Groupe de Saint-Luc originated.

The Four Evangelists (1922), Lausanne Cathedral

Poncet became one of the most important representatives of modern sacred art in French-speaking Switzerland, with works including those in the churches of Notre-Dame in Geneva and Saint-Paul in Grange-Canal (municipality of Chêne-Bougeries) and the windows of the Evangelists (1922) and the Crucifixion (1927) in Lausanne Cathedral. In the 1920s he spent time in Paris. From 1945 he taught at the cantonal school of drawing and applied art (École cantonale de dessin et d'art appliqué) in Lausanne. Influenced at first by Ferdinand Hodler and Art Nouveau, he turned increasingly to Expressionism in his stained glass, mosaics, and paintings. He received a federal art scholarship (Eidgenössisches Kunststipendium) in 1933 and a Pro Arte scholarship in 1944.

== Bibliography ==
- Marcel Poncet, exhibition catalog, Vevey, 1984
- V. Reymond, Marcel Poncet, 1992
- Biografisches Lexikon der Schweizer Kunst, 1998, 831–832
