= Charles-Albert Cingria =

Swiss writer and musician

- Born: February 10, 1883; Geneva, Switzerland
- Died: August 1, 1954 (aged 71); Geneva, Switzerland
- Occupations: Writer, musician
- Relatives: Alexandre Cingria

Charles-Albert Cingria (February 10, 1883 - August 1, 1954) was a Swiss writer and musician. He won the Schiller Prize in 1932 for his biography of Saint Gall, and the Rambert Prize in 1935 for his biography of Petrach. His complete works were republished by Éditions L'Âge d'Homme in 2012.
