= Alexandre Cingria =

Swiss art historian and writer

- Born: 22 March 1879; Geneva, Switzerland
- Died: 8 November 1945 (aged 66); Lausanne, Switzerland
- Known for: Painting, decorating

Alexandre Cingria (March 22, 1879, in Geneva – November 8, 1945, in Lausanne) was a Swiss artist who worked as a painter, illustrator, and art restorer. He was best known for his work on stained glass windows.

== Early life ==
Cingria was born in Geneva in 1879 from a well known Levantine family, and his older brother was Charles-Albert Cingria, a famous writer. He studied at the École nationale supérieure des Beaux-Arts in Paris as well as at several universities, academies, and art schools in Florence, Geneva, and Munich.

== Career ==
He created the stained glass for the Church of Christ-Roi in Tavannes. In 1928 Cingria participated in a competition to design stained glass for St. Pierre Cathedral in Geneva. He created the famous three mosaics located in The Old Arsenal depicting important historical occasions in Geneva, including the mosaic Julius Caesar arrives in Geneva.

== Personal life ==
Cingria, together with his friend and colleague Fernand Dumas, founded the St Luke's Group (Groupe d'artistes St Luc or Groupe de Saint-Luc), an association of artists, architects and intellectuals who were Catholics and loved religious art in French speaking Switzerland. The group was founded in 1919 and operated between the world wars. The two men were known to have met often at the hotel Lion d'Or in Romont. Their club ended up including artists from a wide range of disciplines and origins.

== See also ==
- fr:École des Pâquis
