= Arsenale Institute for Politics of Representation =

Research institution in Venice, Italy

Arsenale Institute
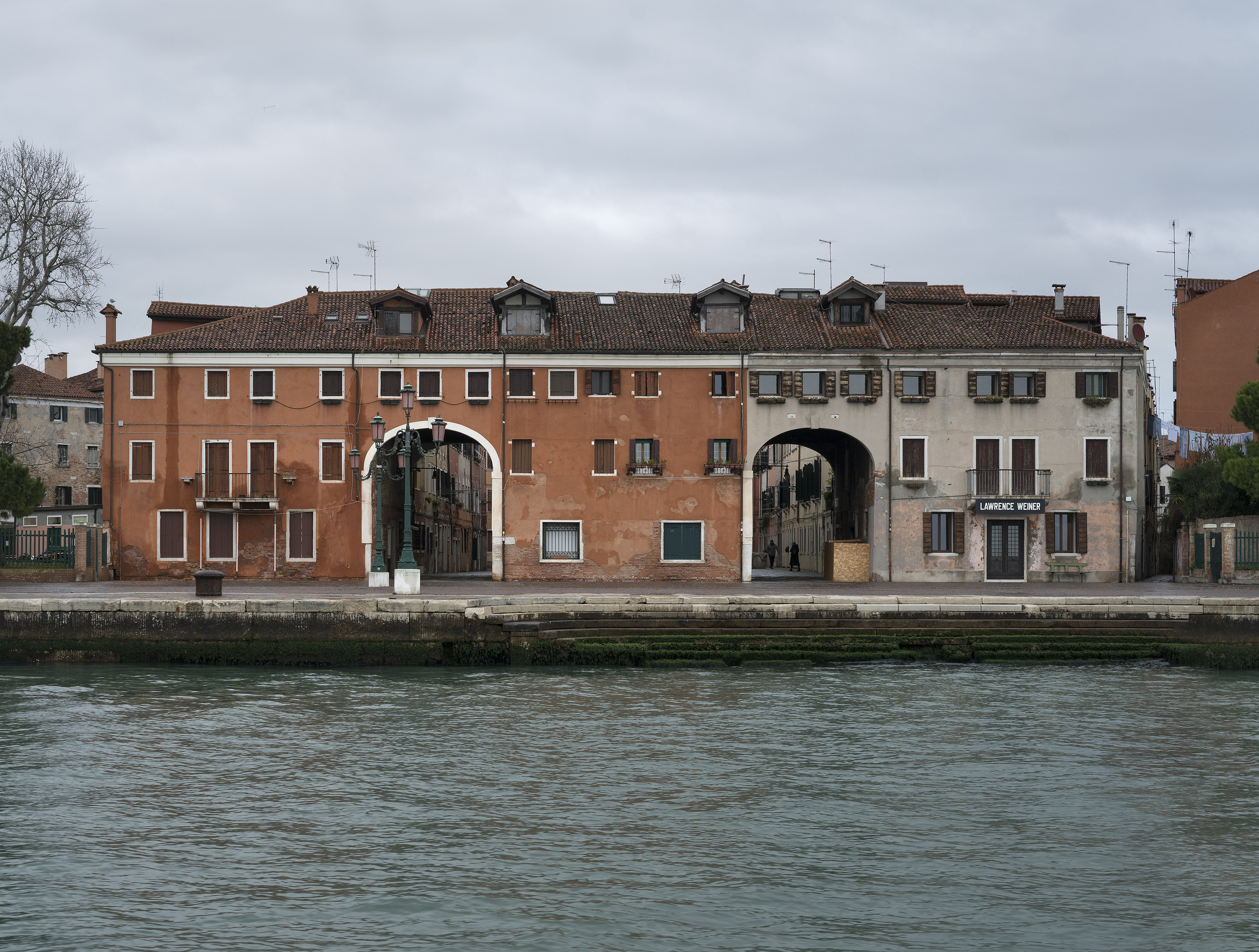
- The Marinarezza complex on the waterfront (Riva dei Sette Martiri) in Venice
- Established: 2009
- Location: Italy, Venice, Marinarezza (Riva dei Sette Martiri)
- Type: Non-profit institution for cultural studies and philosophical research
- Founders: Lewis Baltz, Marco de Michelis, Wolfgang Scheppe
- Director: Wolfgang Scheppe
- Website: arsenale.com

The Arsenale Institute for Politics of Representation is an international institution for cultural studies and philosophical research in Venice, Italy. It focuses on image politics in different areas of social communication, the media and the arts. Special emphasis is given to the study of image criticism in the avant-garde of the early 20th century.

== History ==
The Institute grew out of the class on politics of representation at the IUAV University in Venice. It was founded in 2006 by Lewis Baltz, Marco de Michelis, and Wolfgang Scheppe. In 2009, it became an independent entity under the direction of Wolfgang Scheppe known for his urbanist and image critical work since the 2002 project Endcommercial. It began exhibiting in its current location, the Marinarezza spaces in Venice, in 2017.

== Archives ==
The Arsenale Institute's archive contains an extensive research collection of the avant-garde movements of the early 20th century, with a focus on documents and works by the Futurists, Raymond Roussel, DADA, Marcel Duchamp, the Surrealists, Belgian Revolutionary Surrealism, the Lettrists and Situationists. The Institute's library and archive are available to research for scholars and students upon request.

== Exhibitions ==
The Institute's exhibitions are usually conceived as traveling exhibitions for international venues, designed and probed in the Venice premises in the form of laboratory installations. For example, the 2017 exhibition Tous Contre le Spectacle led to the large exhibition on the Situationists at the HKW in Berlin in 2018. They are complemented by a program of lectures, conferences, guided tours and workshops.

The Institute carries out its projects in cooperation and dialogue with universities, museums and private foundations. Among others, the partnering institutions are: ARCH+, Archiv der Avantgarden: Sammlung Marzona, L'Arengario Studio Bibliografico, Bevilacqua la Masa, The British Council, Bundesministerium für Verkehr und Digitale Infrastruktur, Musée Carnavalet, DOX Centre for Contemporary Art, Fondation Cartier pour l'Art Contemporain, Comune di Venezia, Fondazione Olivetti, Gagosian Gallery, Hatje Cantz, Haus der Kunst, Haus der Kulturen der Welt, Johann Jacobs Museum, Lisson Gallery, Mai 36 Galerie, Marian Goodman Gallery, Nero Publishers, Regen Projects, Staatliche Kunstsammlungen Dresden, Steidl Verlag, Storefront for Art and Architecture and Verlag der Buchhandlung Walther König.

== Location ==
The Arsenale Institute is located in a prominent building named Marinarezza located directly on the waterfront (Riva dei Sette Martiri). It is recognised as an important example of Venetian vernacular architecture that anticipates the urbanism of the modern city.

The complex, dating back to 1347 includes a series of houses that, since the 14th century, were given free of charge to seamen and shipyard workers at the Arsenale who had rendered services to the Republic of Venice. In 1645, a front building for workshops and warehouses was added to the ensemble, enclosing the two alleys with monumental arches facing the waterfront. The three parallel rows of Gothic dwellings behind it embody not only one of the earliest known approaches to the concept of public housing, but also that of modular architecture.

== Exhibitions (selection) ==
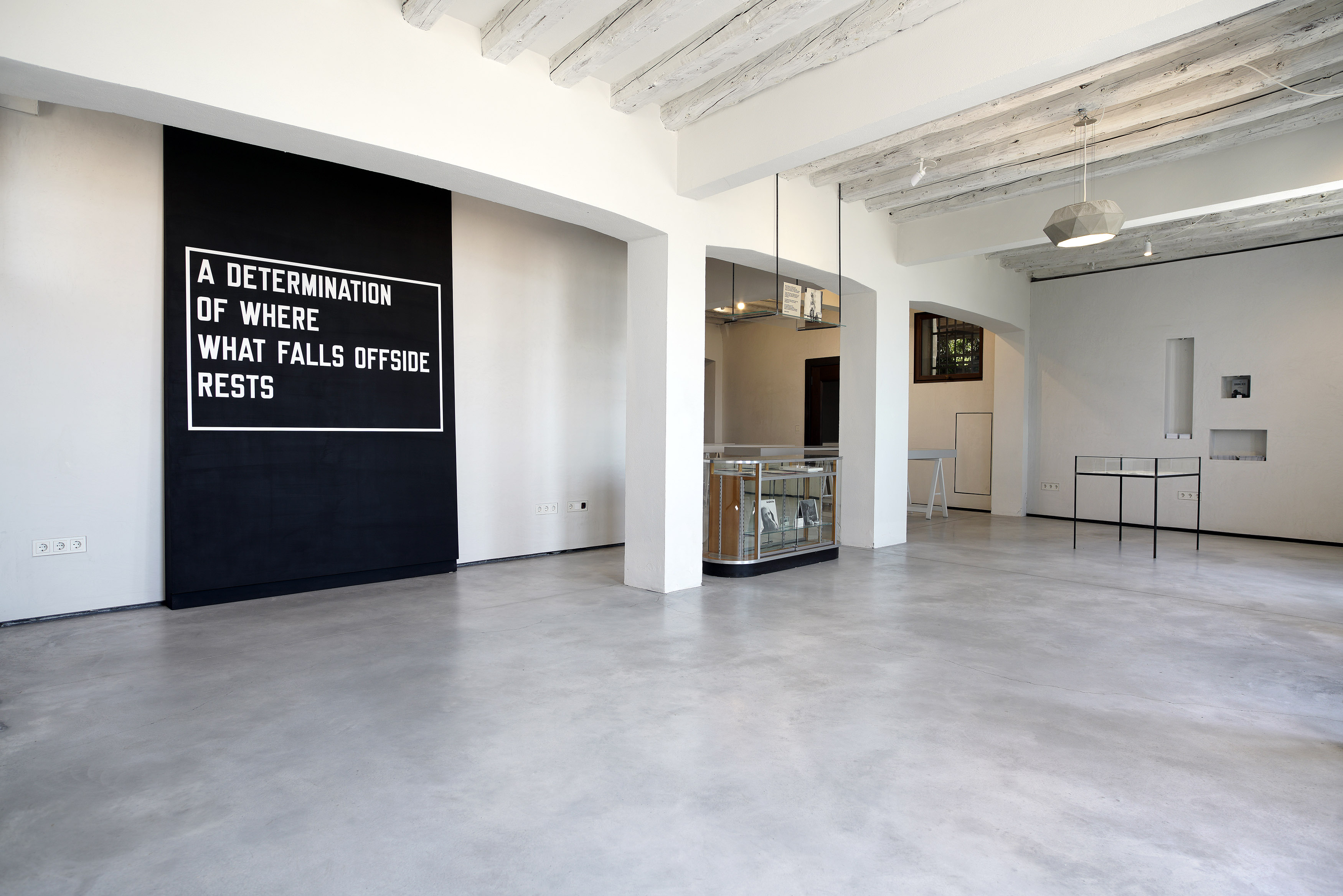
The Arsenale Institute's exhibition space in the Marinarezza building on the occasion of the exhibition on Lawrence Weiner in 2022

The following include both collaborations and independently organized exhibitions:

- 2009 Migropolis, Bevilacqua la Masa, Venice
- 2010 Done-Book, 12th International Architecture Biennale Venice, The British Council
- 2014 The Things of Life / The Life of Things, SKD, Dresden
- 2014 Logical Rain, SKD, Dresden
- 2015 Supermarket of the Dead, Fire Sacrifice in China and the Cult of Globalized Consumption, SKD, Dresden
- 2016 Surveying the Non-Human. On the Aesthetics of Racism, SKD, Dresden
- 2016 The Soul of Money, DOX, Prague
- 2017 Sacred Goods, Johann Jacobs Museum, Zurich
- 2017 Tous Contre le Spectacle, Marinarezza, Venice
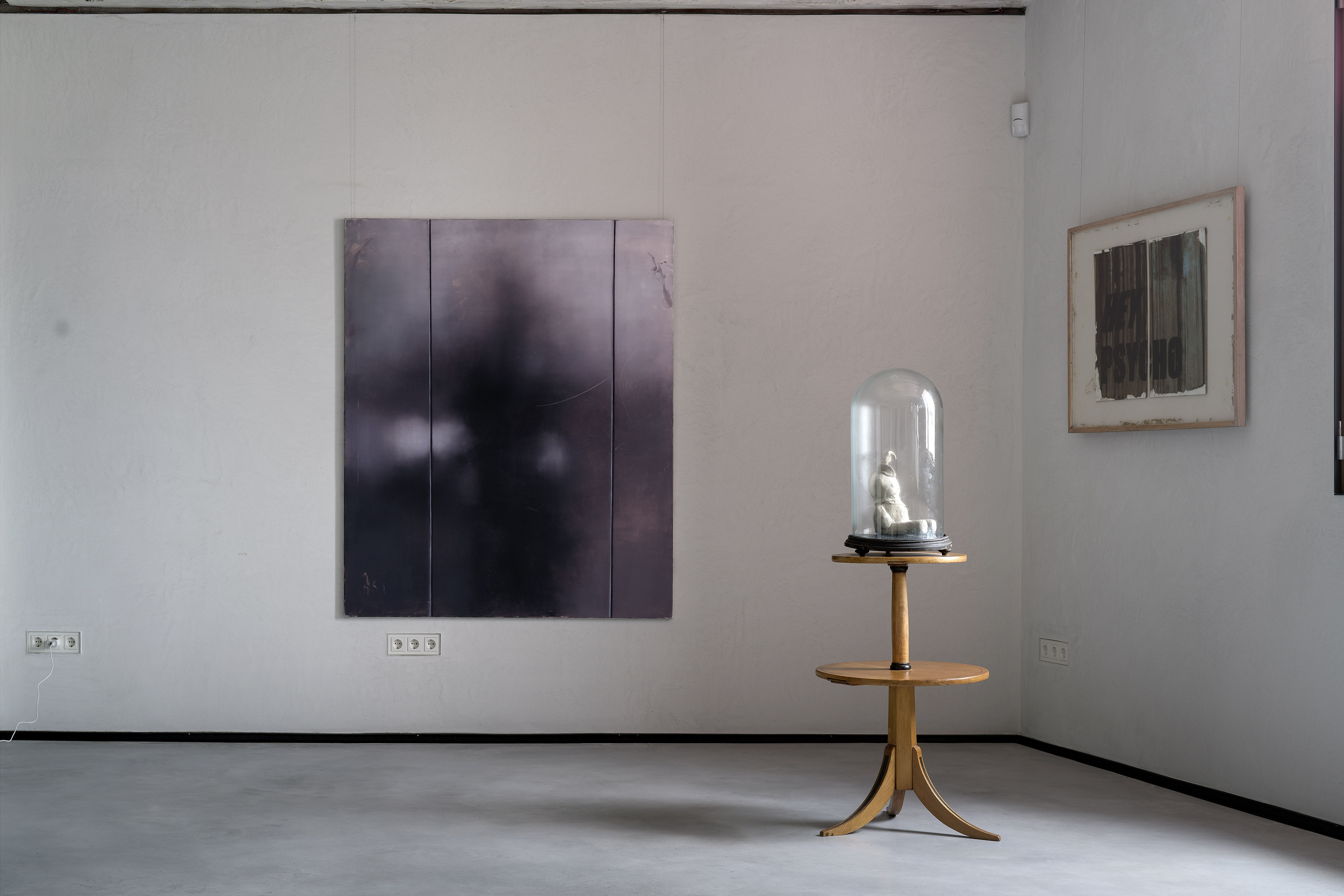
  The Arsenale Institute's exhibition space on the occasion of the exhibition ‘Hey Psycho!’ in 2019 with works by Douglas Gordon and Florian Süssmayr
- 2018 Unbuilt, Marinarezza, Venice
- 2018 The Most Dangerous Game, HKW, Berlin
- 2019 Hey Psycho!, Marinarezza, Venice
  - featuring works of Douglas Gordon and Florian Süssmayr
- 2020 Paul Nougé, Non voloir, Marinarezza, Venice
- 2022 Architecture of Speed, Marinarezza, Venice
- 2022 The Language of Lawrence Weiner, Marinarezza, Venice

== Publications (selection) ==
The following publications are based on research conducted or supported by the Institute:

- Wolfgang Scheppe: Migropolis / Atlas of a Global Situation, 2 Vol., Hatje Cantz, Ostfildern, 2009, ISBN 978-3-7757-4111-8
- Wolfgang Scheppe: Done.Book: Picturing the City of Society, The British Council/Hatje Cantz, Ostfildern, 2010, ISBN 978-3-7757-2773-0
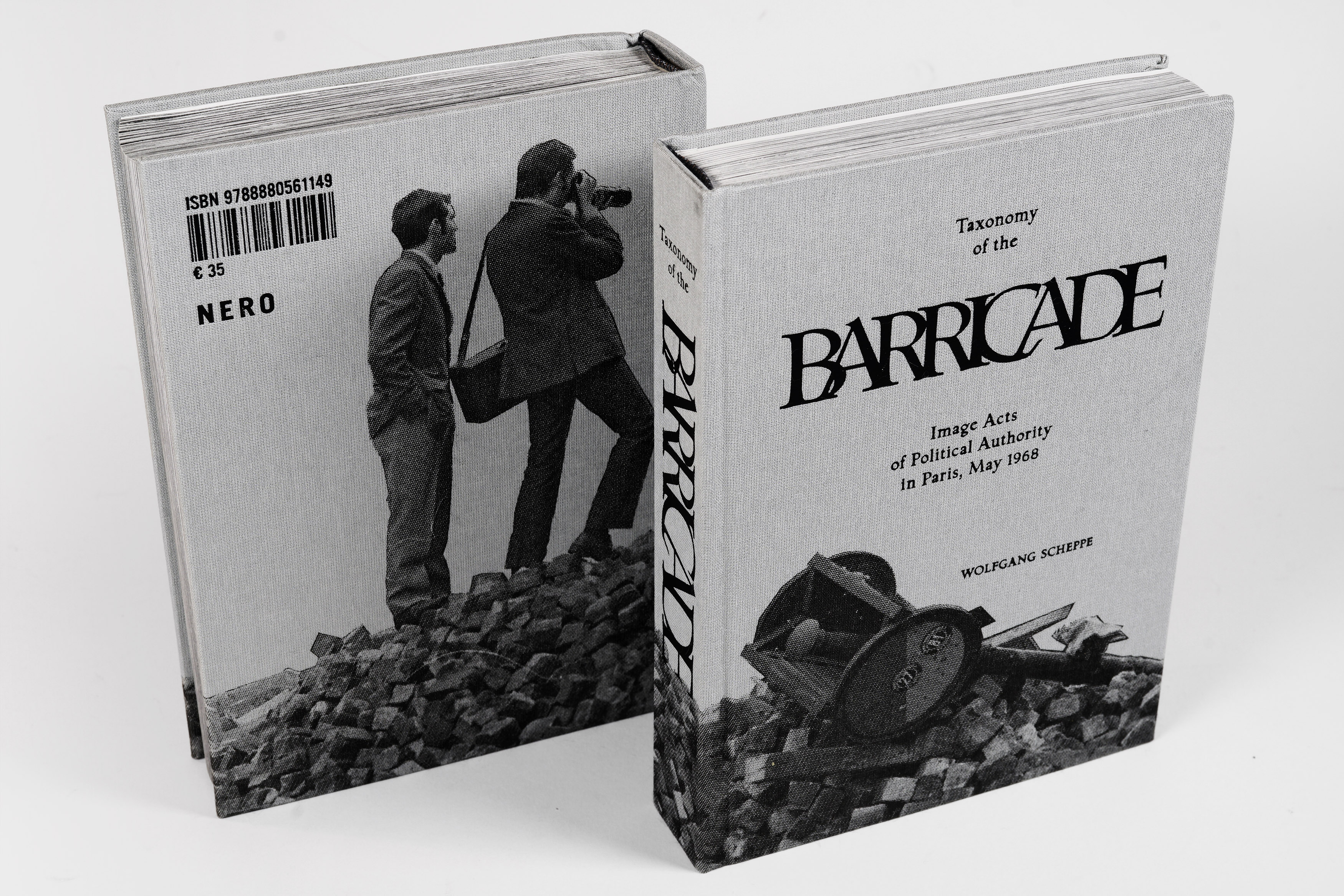
  Wolfgang Scheppe: Taxonomy Of The Barricade. Image Acts of Political Authority in May 1968, Nero, Rome, 2021, ISBN 978-88-8056-114-9
- Lewis Baltz: Candlestick Point, Steidl, Göttingen 2011, ISBN 978-3-86930-109-9
  - Wolfgang Scheppe: 'The Garden of False Reality', in Candlestick Point, Steidl, Göttingen 2011, ISBN 978-3-86930-109-9
- Lewis Baltz: 'Migropolis', in: Texts, Steidl, Göttingen, 2012, ISBN 978-3-86930-436-6
- Lewis Baltz: Venezia Marghera, Steidl, Göttingen, 2013, ISBN 978-3-86930-313-0
- Wolfgang Scheppe: The Things of Life / The Life of Things, 3 Vol., Walther König, Cologne, 2014, ISBN 978-3-86335-550-0
- Wolfgang Scheppe: Logical Rain, SKD, Dresden, 2014, ISBN 978-3-944555-00-3
- Wolfgang Scheppe: Supermarket of the Dead, Fire offerings in China and the Cult of Globalised Consumption, 3 Vol., Walther König, Cologne, 2015, ISBN 978-3-86335-716-0
- Wolfgang Scheppe: 'L’invention de l’image de la Ville', in: Le Marais en héritage(s), Musée Carnavalet, Paris, 2015, ISBN 978-2-7596-0306-0
- Wolfgang Scheppe: Surveying the Non-Human. On the Aesthetics of Racism, SKD, Dresden, 2016, ISBN 978-3-944555-02-7
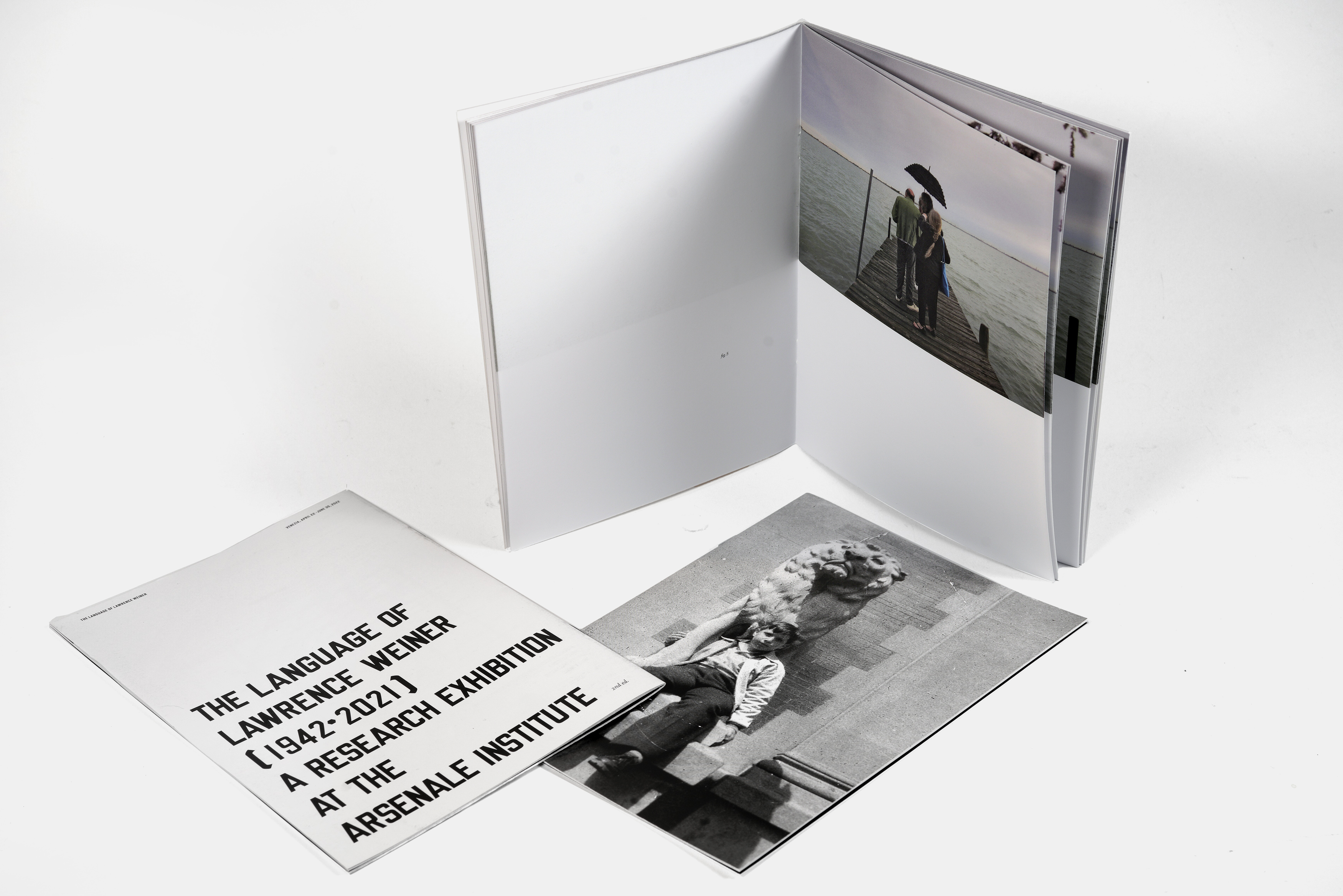
  Wolfgang Scheppe: Leaving an Island (Lawrence Weiner’s farewell), Walther König, Köln, 2022, ISBN 978-3-7533-0343-7
- Wolfgang Scheppe: 'Die legislative Erfindung des Stadtbildes', in: ARCH+ 225, 2016
- Roberto Ohrt, Wolfgang Scheppe: The Most Dangerous Game, 2 Vol., Merve, Leipzig, 2018, ISBN 978-3-96273-019-2
- Wolfgang Scheppe: 'The Ground-Rent of Art and Exclusion from the City', in: The Property Issue. Politics of Space and Data, Birkhäuser, Basel, 2020, ISBN 978-3-0356-2106-8
- Wolfgang Scheppe: Taxonomy of the Barricade, Image Acts of Political Authority in May 1968, Nero, Rome, 2021, ISBN 978-88-8056-114-9
- Michael Vahrenwald, Wolfgang Scheppe: The People's Trust, Kominek, Berlin, 2021, ISBN 978-3-9819824-6-6
- Wolfgang Scheppe: Leaving an Island (Lawrence Weiner’s farewell), Walther König, Köln, 2022, ISBN 978-3-7533-0343-7
