= Pomona Zipser =

German sculptor

- Born: 1958 (age 67–68)
- Education: Academy of Fine Arts, Munich, Germany; University of the Arts, Berlin, Germany
- Known for: Sculpture

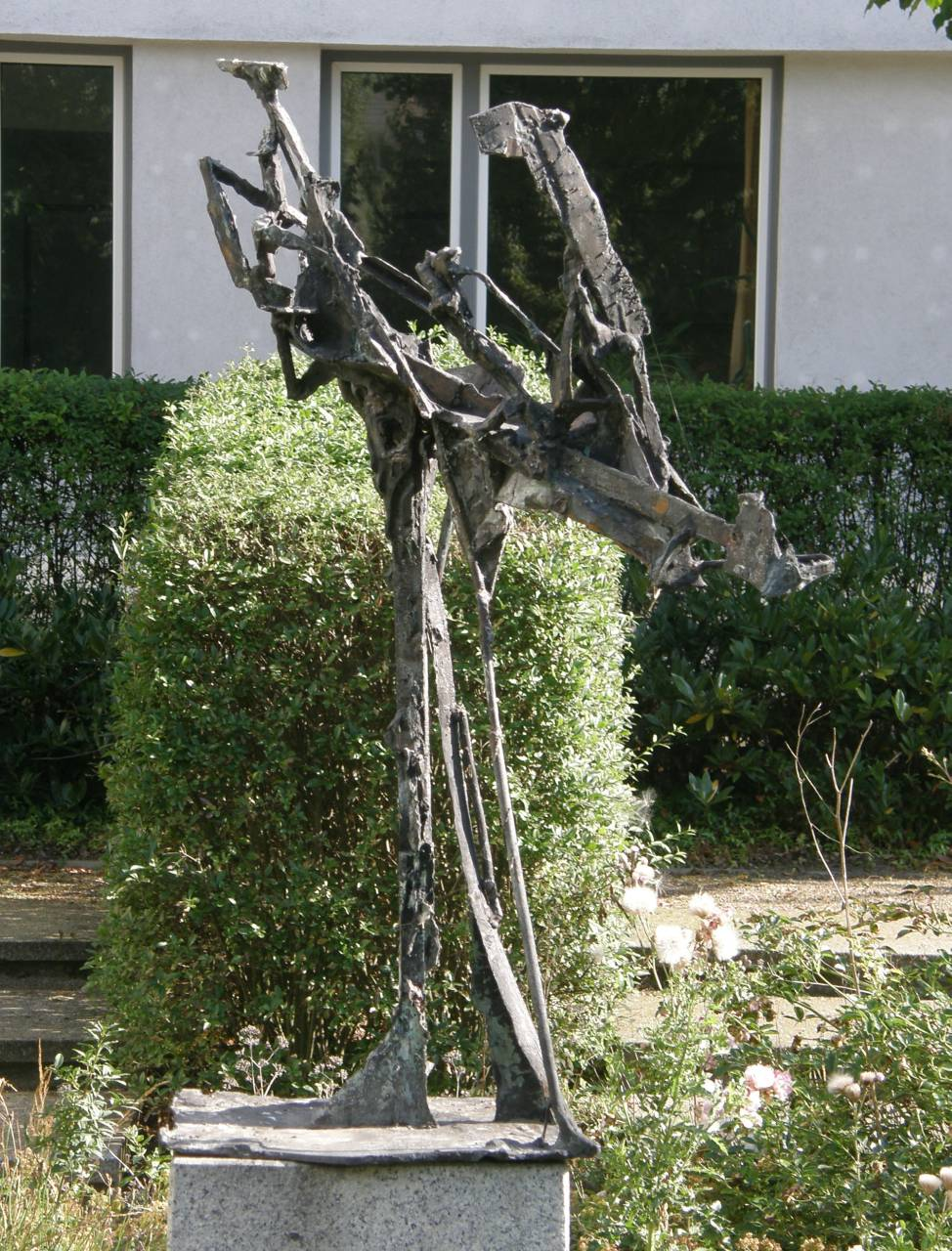
Pomona Zipser, Auf hoher See, Skulpturengarten AVK, Rubensstr. 125, Berlin

Pomona Zipser (born 28 June 1958 in Sibiu) is a Romanian-born contemporary artist based in Berlin, known for her sculptures. She was born in 1958 in Romania and moved to Germany with her mother in 1970. Zipser studied at the Academy of Fine Arts in Munich and the Berlin University of the Arts.

== Artistic practice ==
Pomona Zipser works across various mediums, including bronze, aluminium, concrete, and wood. She often creates composite sculptures or constructions combining different materials. In an interview with Heinke Fabritius, she said she prefers to work with found objects, such as wood forged from her studio's neighbourhood. As a part of her 2009 solo show, Rot aus der Wand, a catalogue with the text of Jörn Merkert was published. The German art historian described Pomona Zipser's sculptures this way:

"[They] are constructions made of scrap wood, boards, boxes, rarely from technical wheels, in any case from used parts that appear alienated in the work of art. They are transformed into something through unexpected combinations, through the parts and by painting them into something different. [...] The colouring gives the sculptures their 'skin', their physical unity – however ephemeral it may be. This reinforces their symbolism in space and through this they gain the necessary sharp plastic precision. Imbued with colour, as it were, they usually do not appear as mighty volumes, but as material sculptures completely dematerialised. [...] They consist of countless individual parts that are linked together with wires and ropes, and cords, also carpentered, crudely nailed or screwed together, interlocking here, contactlessly side by side and against each other there. Sometimes they are assembled from large raw parts, others are delicately mounted; they are spatial collages [...] With this method, linear constructions are created that extend far into the room with their tentacles that advance, extend and return, are complex drawings in three dimensions and cut through the air from the wall into the room, across the floor and up to the ceiling cutting through the air."

== Selected exhibitions ==
Since the 1980s Pomona Zipser's works have been shown at multiple exhibitions, in notable galleries as well as public institutions. In 1989, a sculpture of Pomona Zipser, The Eleventh Chant, was purchased by the Berlinische Galerie in Berlin, Germany. The monumental, mixed material installation became a part of the collection directed by Jörn Merkert, who is also a collector of Pomona Zipser's work.

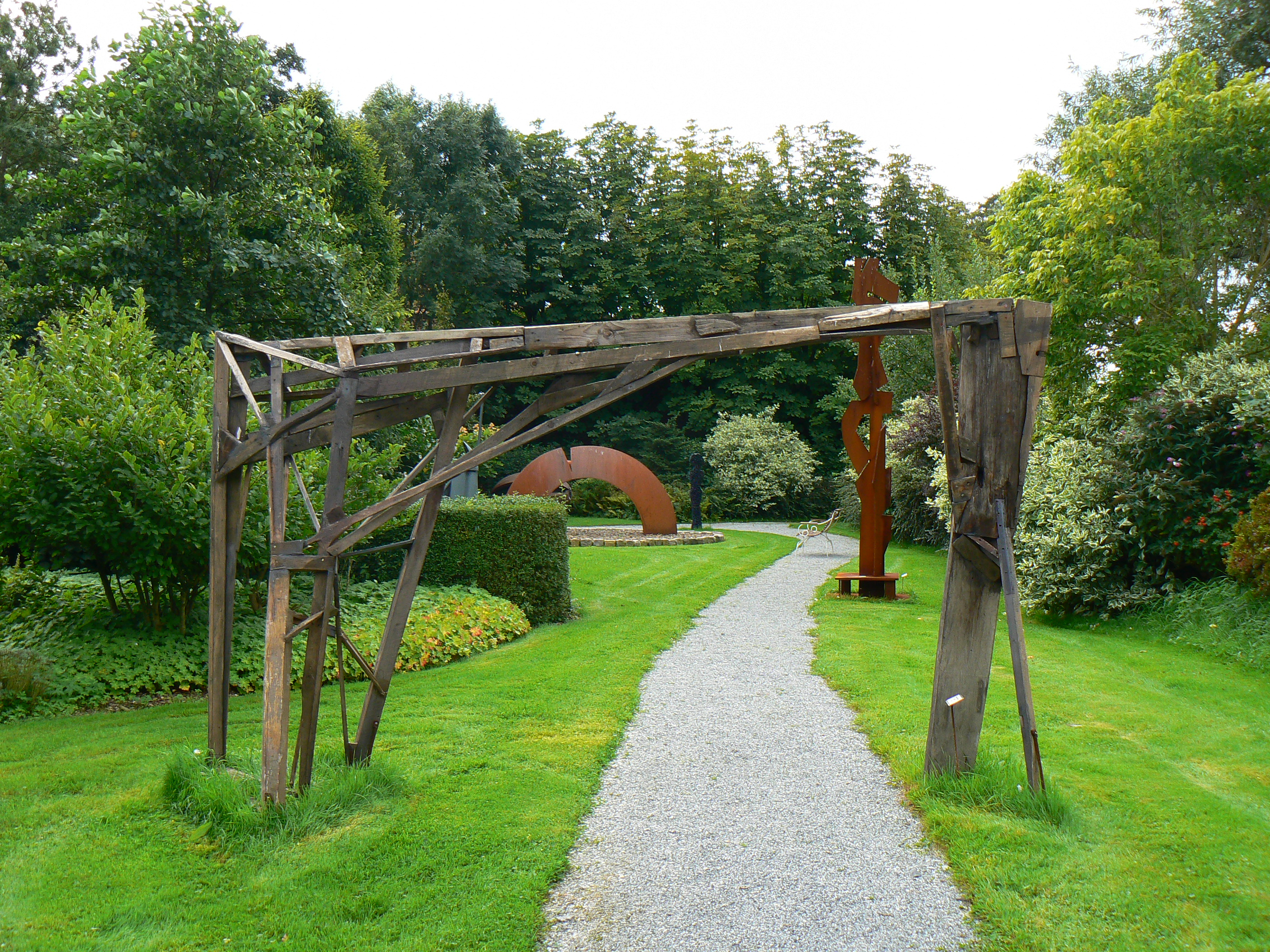
Pomona Zipser, Tor, 2002, Funnix, Germany

In 1990, the Berlinische Galerie collection travelled to Dublin with an exhibitions Kunstszene Berlin West (The West Berlin Art Scene), showcasing works of Berlin-based artists in Ireland. Alongside the exhibition, the catalogue with all works was produced. The same year, Pomona Zipser participated in the XLIV Venice Biennale with the exhibition Ambiente Berlin. Another exhibition of Pomona Zipser's works in Venice was organised in 1993. International Female Artists made a show Le Onde (The Waves) and published a book accompanying the exhibition.

In early 2000s, Pomona Zipser was once again exhibiting her works, presenting the contemporary sculptural trends in Berlin. The exhibition All about Berlin I: Skulptur in the White BOX-Kultfabrik in Munich showcased 45 sculptures by 22 sculptors from the capital, focusing on the novel artistic approaches to the medium.

When an annual outdoor exhibition Sculpture by the Sea went international for the first time in 2009, Pomona Zipser was invited to present her works. The show, inaugurated by the Royal Couple, took place a coastal city of Aarhus. Sculpture by the Sea exhibition showcased the contemporary sculptural practice in a dramatic landscape, rocky shoreline bordering a forest, juxtaposing the works with nature.

In 2009, Pomona Zipser had a solo show, titled Rot aus der Wand, in Morat-Institut für Kunst und Kunstwissenschaft in Breisgau, Freiburg, Germany. It gave her a change to display her sculptural forms, along with ink drawings and sculptures in bronze.

In 2013, Pomona Zipser exhibited together with Sati Zech as a part of the exhibition series Recontre, which focused on artistic encounters expanding artists' reference framework. The series started in Galerie van de Loo Projekte in 2011, when Marcel Hüppauff placed his works side by side with those of Asger Jorn. In the case of the 2013 Recontre, the juxtaposition of Pomona Zipser's and Sati Zech's sculptures was based on their shared artistic interest in exploration of space and former common experiences. They both studied under Lothar Fischer at Academy of Fine Arts in Munich in the 1980s.

During the show, The Title is 'Untitled', held in 2019, Pomona Zipser exhibited her elaborate constructions at the Municipal Gallery Cordonhaus Cham, exploring the boundary between surface and space. Her works were presented with Kolja Gollub's paintings and drawings, conquering the space with linear form elements. The exhibition offered a dialogue between the two artists' works.

The exhibition weiß.nullpunkt der moderne in Milchhof Arnstadt explored the relationship between modernism and craftsmanship that followed the evolution of design over the past 100 years. The transition was demonstrated through different materials, such as facades, plaster, tiles, paper, and porcelain, questioning the gestural approach of the avant-garde in 1919 and examining the compatibility of modernism and craftsmanship. On this occasion, Pomona Zipser presented her expressive sculptures, characterised by a blend of organic and technical design elements, made of collected wood pieces connected by cords, wires, and screws with a monochrome finish. According to the catalogue, produced alongside the show, the exhibition invited visitors to appreciate the subtleties and differences of materials and forms in modern art and design.

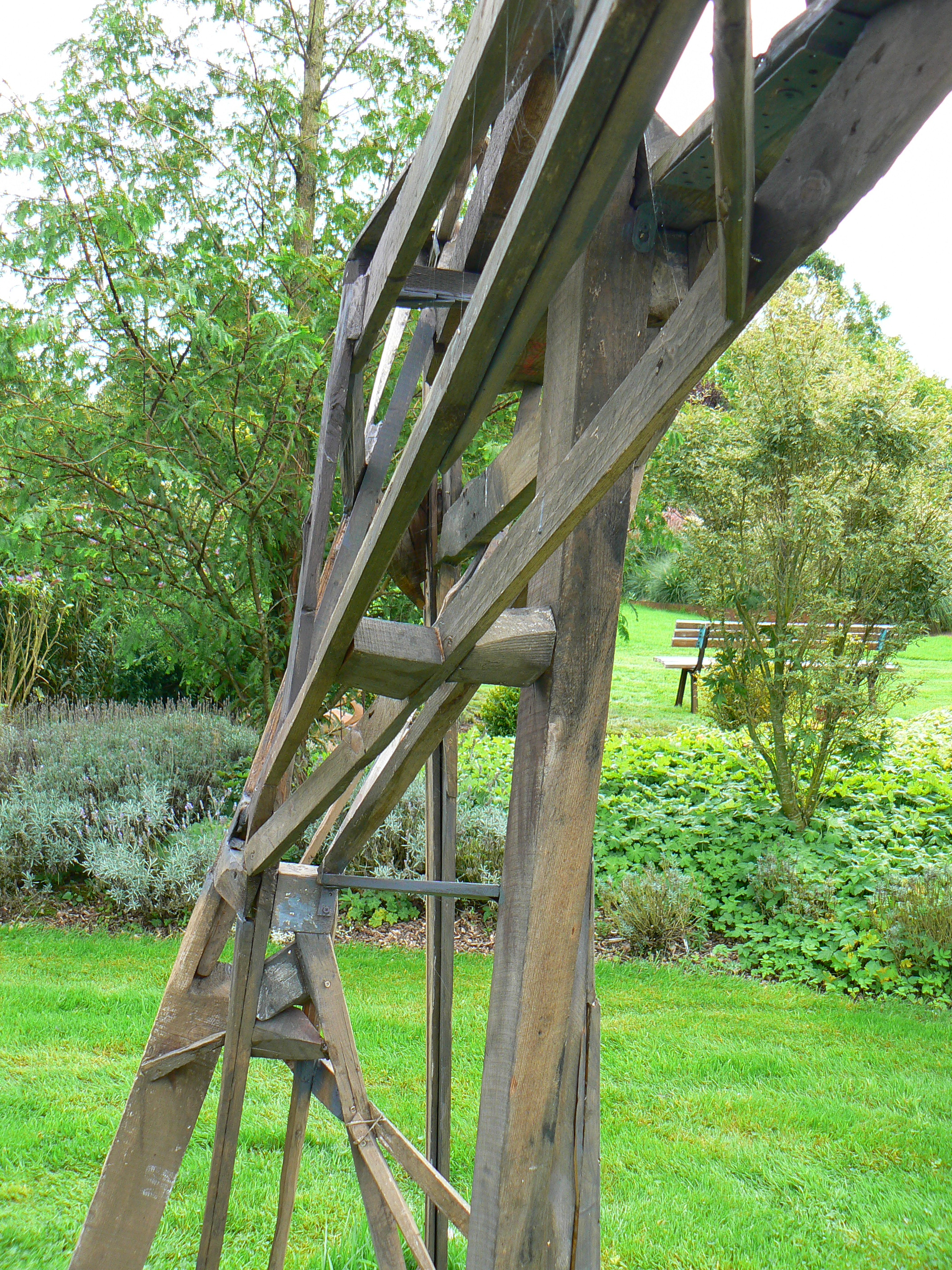
Pomona Zipser,Tor (detail), 2002, Funnix, Germany

Another curatorial project of Pomona Zipser was the exhibition Möbelhaus Kunst at Kunsthaus sans titre in Potsdam in 2021. The participants were selected by Pomona Zipser and Claudia Busching, many of whom have been active in the Berlin art scene for over 30 years. The show showcased works from 33 artists sorted and closely arranged like furniture in a store, aiming to explore the market value of art from a distance, allowing for a certain degree of freedom. The works on display included lamps made from recycled materials, painted ceramic dishes, a playfully designed bar, a rug painted on the floor, and a video of heather going up in flames.

In 2015, Pomona Zipser participated in the exhibition Ladies First! which aimed to counteract the suppression of women's art. The show curated by Gudrun Danzer and Günther Holler-Schuster, presented the works of female artists shedding light on their life stories and working conditions from the mid-19th century to the mid-20th century in Styria, a region of southern Austria. The Neue Galerie Graz developed the project in line with feminist art history, aiming to represent previously unknown female artists and rehabilitate erased positions, correcting the historical view of women's art.

Pomona Zipser is not only a sculptor but also developed her own curatorial project. The show In den Raum zeichnen. umreißen – verdichten – spuren (Drawing in space. outline – condense – trace), made together with Claudia Busching in 2017. This highly autothematic exhibition series were a collaborative project about linear sculpture in Berlin with Galerie Parterre Berlin, Galerie Nord | Kunstverein Tiergarten and the house at Kleistpark. The catalogue was part of exhibitions and examined how sculptors, painters, video, and media artists appropriated space in dialogue with historical positions. In the texts of Stefanie Endlich, Angela Lammert, Robert Kudielka, and Monika Bartholomé the concept of the line in sculptural practice was emphasised and juxtaposed with problems of a three-dimensional space.

In 2020, Pomona Zipser exhibited with Claudia Busching and Andrew Stonyer at the ZAK, the Center for Contemporary Art. The show Not only in Space but also in Time tackled matters concerning structural spatial concerns. The artists who participated in the show formulated their spatial ideas within the confines of a 600-square-meter space situated within the Spandau Citadel in Berlin.

In 2022, Pomona Zipser again collaborated with Galerie van de Loo Projekte, participating in the Türöffner show. It featured works by Pomona Zipser, Julia Bornefeld, Beate Haupt, Heike Pillemann (whose work gave a title to the exhibition), Eun Nim Ro, and Yolanda Tabanera. The exhibition, opened after the covid pandemic, focused around concepts missed during this solitary time, such as creative exchange and discursive collaboration.

Henkel, meaning a handle in German, was a central theme of the show Henkel Art in Wiesbaden organised by Galerie Hafemann. Works of Claudia Buschnig, Susanne Specht, and Pomona Zipser explored metaphoric connotations of this object, its functionality, and social purpose in relation to its form.

In 2023, Pomona Zipser works travelled to Venice once again, to become a part of an exhibition Ponteggi Narrativi at Arsenale Institute for Politics of Representation.

== Public art (selection) ==
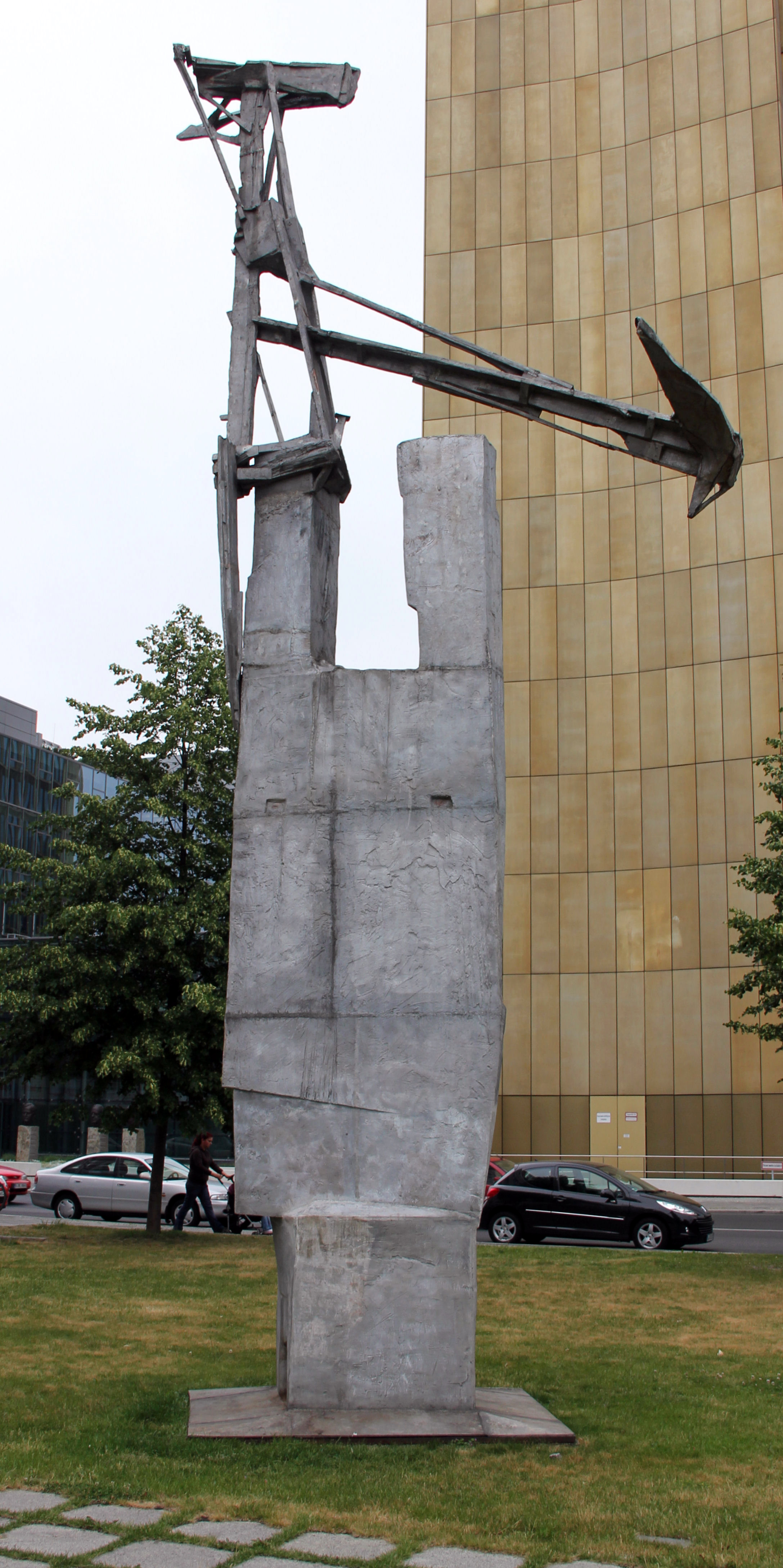
Sculpture by Pomona Zipser, 1999/2000, aluminium, 900 x 400 x 200 cm, Lindenstraße 66, Berlin, Germany.

Pomona Zipser made several large-scale installations and commissions.

Pomona Zipser won the competition organised by the Berliner Wasserbetriebe, and constructed a monumental, aluminium sculpture on the corner of Rudi-Dutschke and Lindenstrasse in Berlin.

One of Pomona Ziper's works is in a park around Auguste-Victoria-Klinikum in Schöneberg. A bronze sculpture, titled Auf hoher See, became a part of the Berlin Senate collection in the 1980s, and was later placed in the sculpture garden surrounding the hospital.

In 2008, Zipser won a competition for a sculpture for the Montgolfier-Gymnasium in Berlin. The contest was sponsored by the State of Berlin, specifically the District Office of Treptow-Köpenick. As a result, she created two aluminium sculptures and reconstructed a historic wall mural.

Another public work of Pomona Zipser is a concrete stelae for the Földerichschule in Berlin. The stelae, which measure 240 x 40 x 40 cm, were created in collaboration with children. The work was presented at the reopening of Földerichplatz after its restructuralization, in 2011.

Pomona Ziper's works are not only displayed in Germany, but also in other European countries. For instance, she created a wooden sculpture Yasasin for the Forest of Dean Sculpture Trail in the UK.

== Awards (selection) ==
Zipser has received several awards and grants throughout her career, including

- Jean Walter Prize for the study of fresco painting in Romania (1979)
- Scholarship of the Studienstiftung des Deutschen Volkes (1979)
- Scholarship for young artists of the University of the Arts, Berlin (1988)
- Artists' working stipends given by the Berlin Senate (1990)
- Marianne Werefkin Prize (1990)
- Artists Award of the Grundkreditbank (1996)
- Gabriele Münter Prize (2004)
