= Wolfgang Scheppe =

German philosopher (born 1955)

- Born: May 23, 1955 (age 71); Munich, Germany
- Education: LMU Munich
- Occupations: Philosopher, curator, visual artist
- Notable work: Migropolis

Wolfgang Scheppe (born 23 May 1955 in Munich, Germany) is a German philosopher, author and curator who since 1996 has lived and taught in the United States, Switzerland and Italy. His work as a theorist frequently includes the medium of exhibitions taking a form described as “theory installations”. Since 2009, he has directed the Arsenale Institute for Politics of Representation in Venice, which emerged from the Università Iuav di Venezia and was founded with Lewis Baltz.

== Work ==
=== Migropolis, 2009 ===
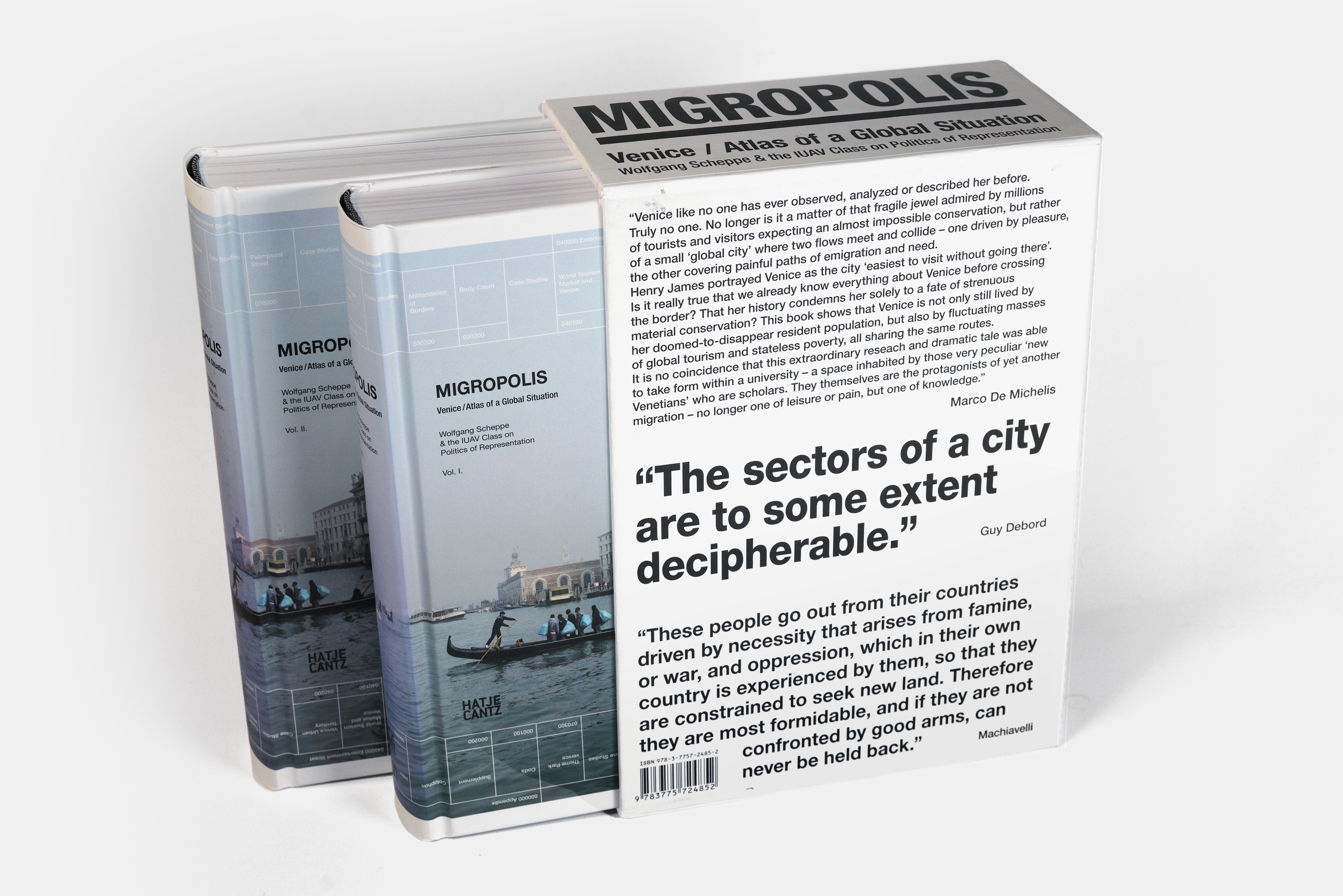
Wolfgang Scheppe: Migropolis / Atlas of a Global Situation, 2 Vol., Hatje Cantz, Ostfildern, 2009, ISBN 978-3-7757-4111-8

Migropolis and the earlier Endcommercial study were formally innovative research projects extending over several years, which were dedicated to the crisis of the globalized city and carried out in collectives initiated and organized by Scheppe. The respective exhibitions were shown in New York, Berlin, Munich, Rome, Paris and Venice, among other locations. In particular, the two-volume Migropolis achieved the status of a standard work on the urbanism of globalization as the intersection of two conflicting patterns of movement: one representing the voluntary leisure-based mobility of tourism, the other the forced subsistence-based mobility of immigration stigmatized as illegal. Endcommercial a purely visual taxonomic study made over a period of five years, mainly in New York, and examining the crisis economy of the contemporary generic city, was included by Martin Parr in his canon The Photo book: A History, Vol I|.

=== Done Book, 2010 ===
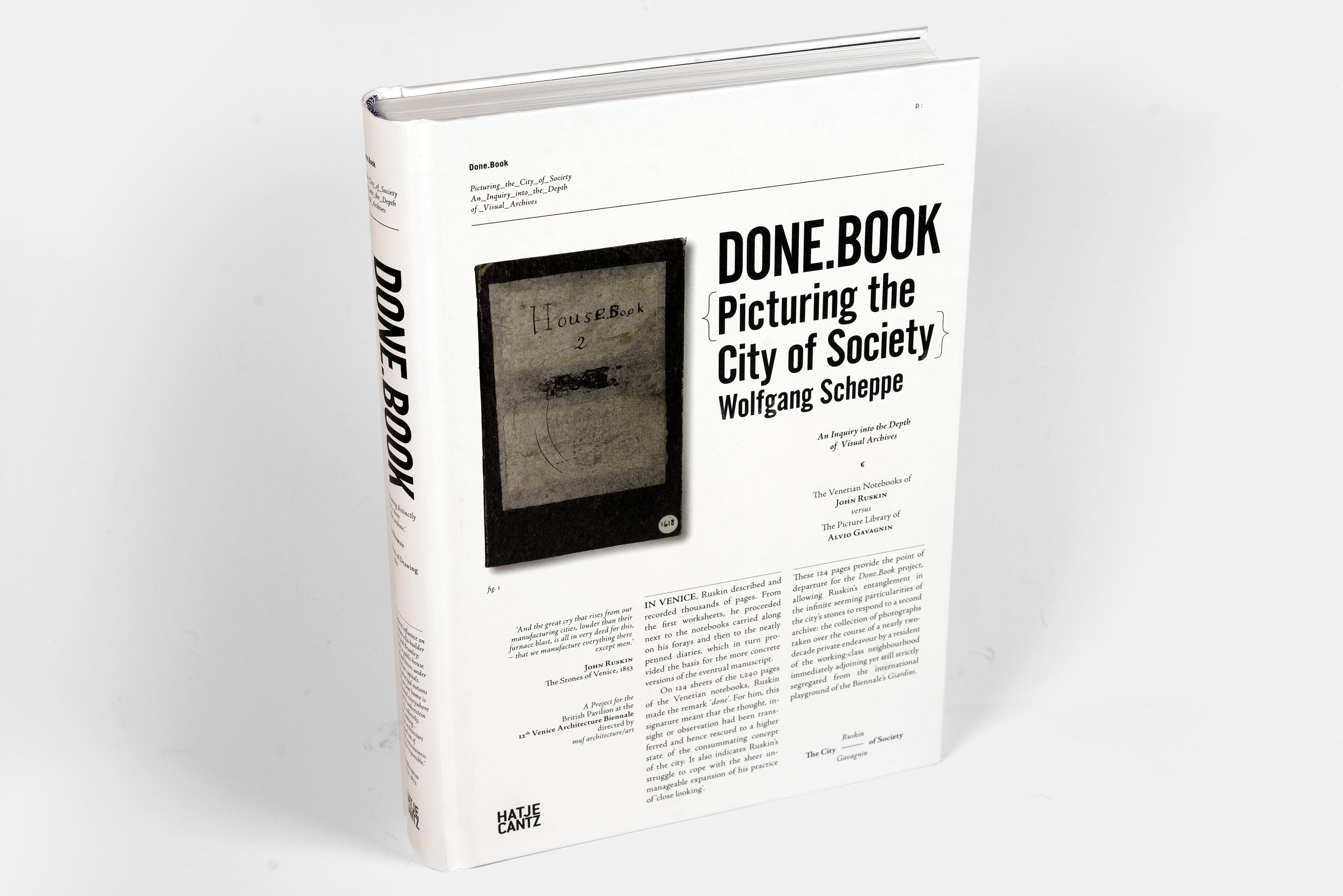
Done Book. Picturing the City of Society, The British Counci/Hatje Cantz, Ostfildern, 2010, ISBN 978-3-7757-2773-0

Done Book is the publication accompanying a project for the British Pavilion at the 2010 Architecture Biennial in Venice. It compares John Ruskin’s visual episteme of urban analysis with the lifelong photographic survey of a Venetian vaporetto conductor begun in the 1960s. The book relates the form of intellectual intuition (Intellektuelle Anschauung) practiced by both to the iconic fictionalization of the touristically economized place of longing. As mirrored in other world cities, this dynamic has exemplary transformed Venice into a consolidated pictorial perception.

=== Things of Life / The Life of Things. Proposition I, 2014 ===
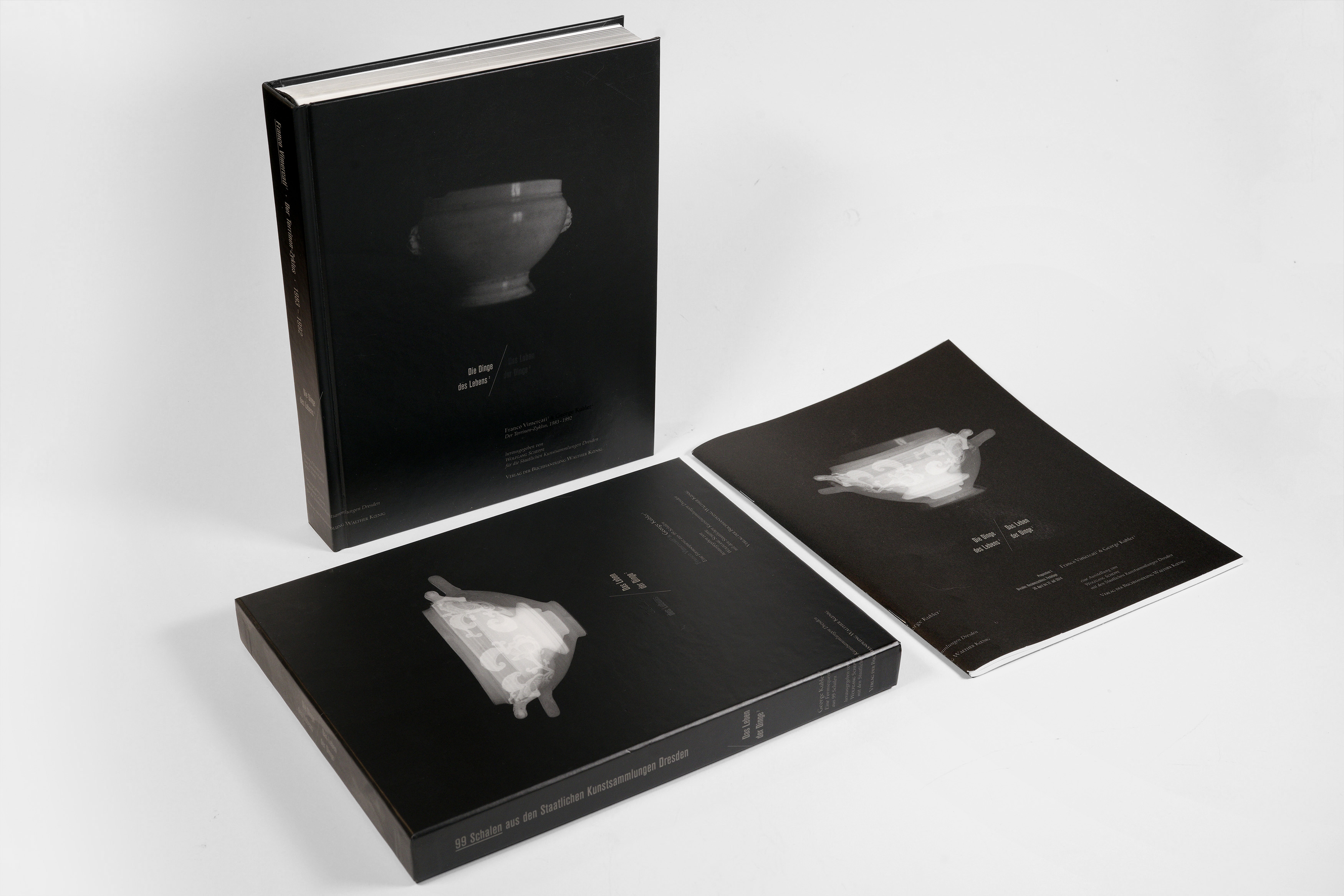
Wolfgang Scheppe: The Things of Life / The Life of Things, 3 Vol., Walther König, Cologne, 2014, ISBN 978-3-86335-550-0

In April 2014, the exhibition of the same name opened on the reception floor of the Residenzschloss (Royal Palace) in Dresden, which had not yet been renovated and restored following damage during the war. It was accompanied by a three-part book object, the core of which was dedicated to George Kubler’s dissident art theory as a point of departure for intellectual intuition as the basis of all exhibiting activities. To this end, it juxtaposed the central block of works by the conceptual artist Franco Vimercati with a sequence of forms conceived according to Kubler's theories, consisting of 99 bowls from all geographical provenances and eras. The exercise addressed museological questions about the cognitively appropriate form of display in an imagined museum of the future. This programmatic exhibition opened a series of exhibitions entitled Propositions after the place where it was held – in its baroque designation the Proposition Hall.

=== Logical Rain. Proposition II, 2014 – 2015 ===
While working as curator at large with the 15 museums in the system of the Dresden State Art Collections, Scheppe rediscovered a unique and long-forgotten treasure in the storage depot of the Water Palace of Schloss Pillnitz. Hidden behind filing cabinets were over 15,000 Japanese textile stencils from the late Edo and Meiji periods. Known as Katagami, these hand-cut patterns were used for printing designs onto fabric; in particular, fabric for kimonos. This collection is believed to be the largest holding of Katagami in the world.

=== Supermarket of the Dead. Proposition III, 2015 ===
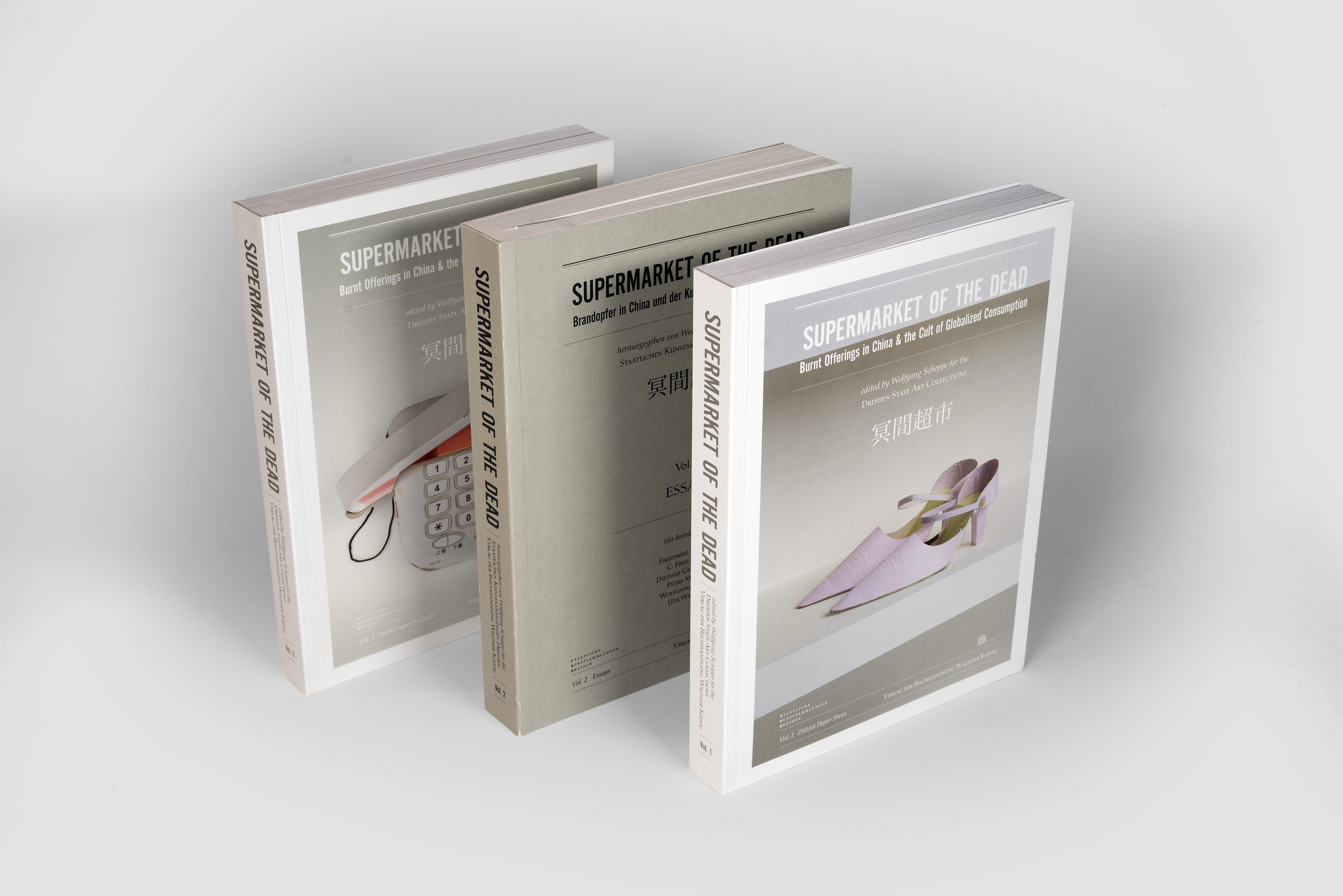
Wolfgang Scheppe, Supermarket of the Dead: Burnt Offerings in China and the Cult of Globalised Consumption, 3 Vol., Walther König, Cologne, 2014, ISBN 978-3-86335-716-0

Supermarket of the Dead and Sacred Goods are implementations of a long-term project initiated in 2014 on the representational magic of brand consumption as reflected in more recent forms of the archaic Chinese fire ritual of burning paper simulacra to transfer goods and valuables to the realm of the dead. Although this popular custom known as Joss paper in the designation of the western world or more accurately Zhǐzā has been politically opposed for most of its history, based only on oral tradition outside any ecclesiastically codified religion, it is thoroughly integrated in daily life and has existed as an unbroken practice for 2,000 years – and today primarily represents the current hegemonic form of commodity fetishism. The research project was encapsulated in a three-volume book published in multiple languages and exhibited in Prague, Dresden and Zurich among other locations.

=== Surveying the Non-Human. Proposition IV, 2016 ===
The four-year research project on the scientific history of racism since the 18th century, focusing on the influential but unknown ethnologist and race theorist Bernhard Struck, resulted in a 2016 exhibition at the Lipsiusbau in Dresden and an extensive catalog distributed as a newspaper. It bore the subtitle On the Aesthetics of Racism. The presentation centered on Struck's obsessive image card index, which sought to prove racial alterity from the empiricism of perceptual evidence with a taxonomy of supposed phenotypes and their quantitative recording through metrical survey data. The ideological rationality of this practice still is the reason for the unaltered popular conceptions of the foreign other who is to be excluded, even in the present. The ever-political demarcations constituting them in the first place congeal with the evidence of perception to yield a quasi-natural rationale for the exclusion of alterity.

=== The Most Dangerous Game, 2018 ===
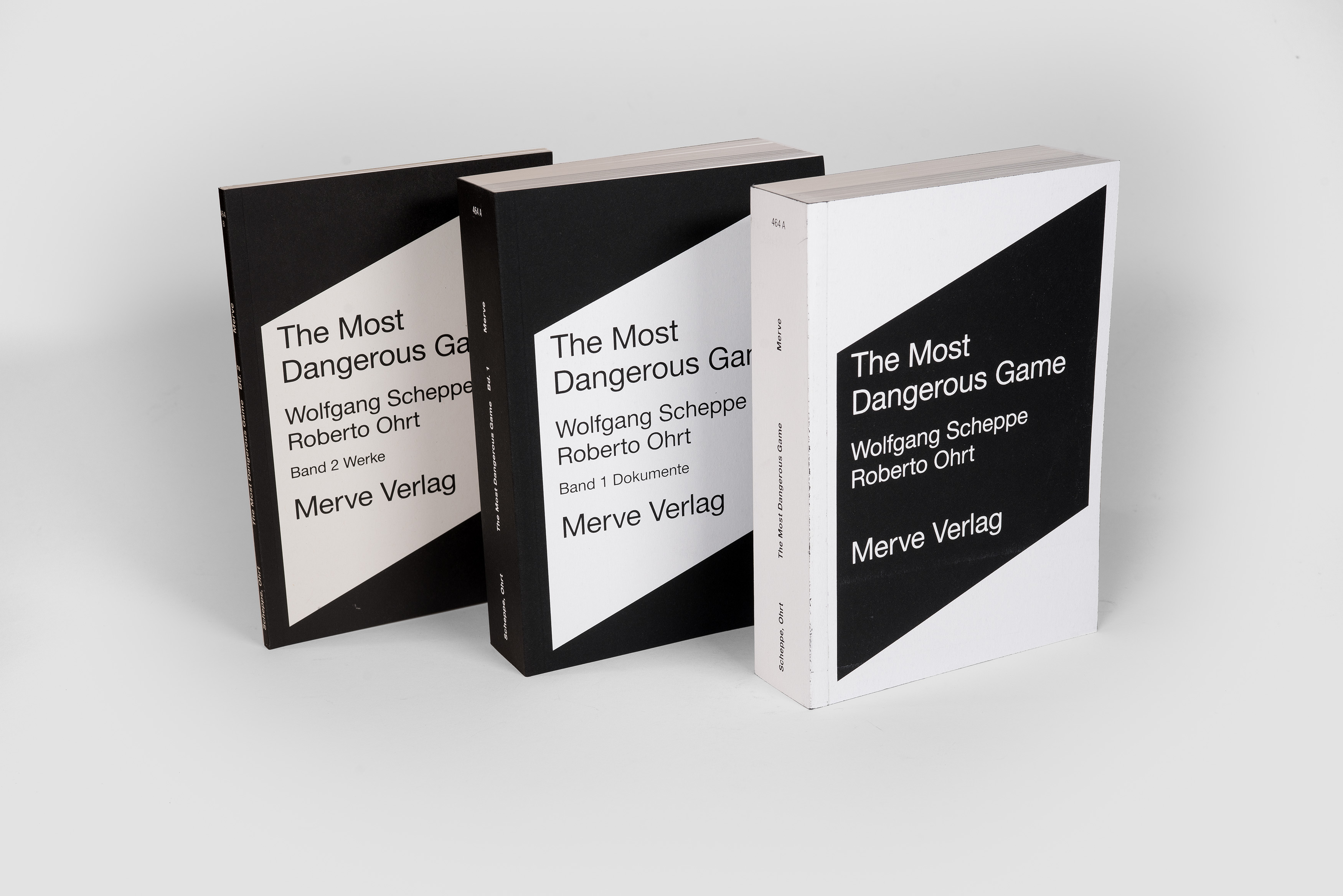
The Most Dangerous Game, Der Weg der Situationistischen Internationale in den Mai 68, (with Roberto Ohrt), Vol. 1 Documents, Vol. 2 Works Merve, Leipzig, 2018, ISBN 978-3-96273-019-2

The Arsenale Institute in Venice mission is the preservation of an extensive archive of documents from the early avant-garde of the 20th century, whose essential epistemological interest was always directed at the figures of thought of negation. The political and artistic traces of the international Situationist movement and its environment are one of the focal points in this collection. Established with an initial donation of documents and works of art from Guy Debord’s widow, the Situationist archive and has grown to become the most extensive and exhaustive collection in Europe. Excerpts from the collection have been presented in several exhibitions, most recently in a large show entitled The Most Dangerous Game at the HKW in Berlin in 2018. For the accompanying volumes, Scheppe worked with Roberto Ohrt and other contributors to reconstruct Guy Debord’s never-realized concept of a “Bibliotheque Situationniste de Silkeborg” in its entirety for the first time.

== Prizes and awards (selection) ==
- Migropolis was awarded “Best Book Design from all over the World 2010" by the German Book Art Foundation.
- Migropolis won the DAM Architectural Book Award 2010 in the category “Urban Sociology”
- Sight-Seeing was awarded the "German Photo Book Prize 2012" in gold
- Taxonomy of the Barricade was named among the "Books of the Year" in Süddeutsche Zeitung, December 29, 2021
- The Done.Book won the „Preis der Stiftung Buchkunst 2010”

== Publications ==
=== Books (selection) ===
- EndCommercial/Reading the City, Hatje Cantz, Ostfildern, 2002 Migropolis / Atlas of a Global Situation, 2 Vol., Hatje Cantz, Ostfildern, 2009, ISBN 978-3-7757-1221-7
- Done Book. Picturing the City of Society, The British Counci/Hatje Cantz, Ostfildern, 2010, ISBN 978-3-7757-2773-0
- Sight-Seeing 1, Bildwürdigkeit und Sehenswürdigkeit, Hatje Cantz, Ostfildern, 2011, ISBN 978-3-7757-3018-1
- Sight-Seeing 2, Bildwürdigkeit und Sehenswürdigkeit, Hatje Cantz, Ostfildern, 2012, ISBN 978-3-7757-3453-0
- The Things of Life / The Life of Things, 3 Vol., Walther König, Cologne, 2014, ISBN 978-3-86335-550-0
- Logical Rain, SKD, Dresden, 2014, ISBN 978-3-944555-00-3
- Supermarket of the Dead: Burnt Offerings in China and the Cult of Globalised Consumption, 3 Vol., Walther König, Cologne, 2014, ISBN 978-3-86335-716-0
- Die Vermessung des Unmenschen, SKD, Dresden, 2016, ISBN 978-3-944555-02-7
- The Most Dangerous Game, Der Weg der Situationistischen Internationale in den Mai 68, (with Roberto Ohrt), Vol. 1 Documents, Vol. 2 Works Merve, Leipzig, 2018, ISBN 978-3-96273-019-2
- Taxonomy of the Barricade, Image Acts of Political Authority in May 1968, Nero, Rome, 2021, ISBN 978-88-8056-114-9

=== Articles (selection) ===
- 'Realabstraktion und Fassade', in: ARCH+ 204, 2011
- 'The Garden of False Reality', in: Candlestick Point, Steidl, Göttingen, 2011
- Le Marais en héritage(s), Musée Carnavalet, Paris, 2015
- 'Die legislative Erfindung des Stadtbildes', in: ARCH+ 225, 2016
- 'Ground-Rent and Exclusion from the City', in: ARCH+ 231, 2018
- 'The pure facade: Towards the expression of prosperity', in: ARCH+ 204, 2021
