= Mai 36 Galerie =

Contemporary art gallery in Zürich, Switzerland

Coordinates: 47.3691°N 8.5477°E

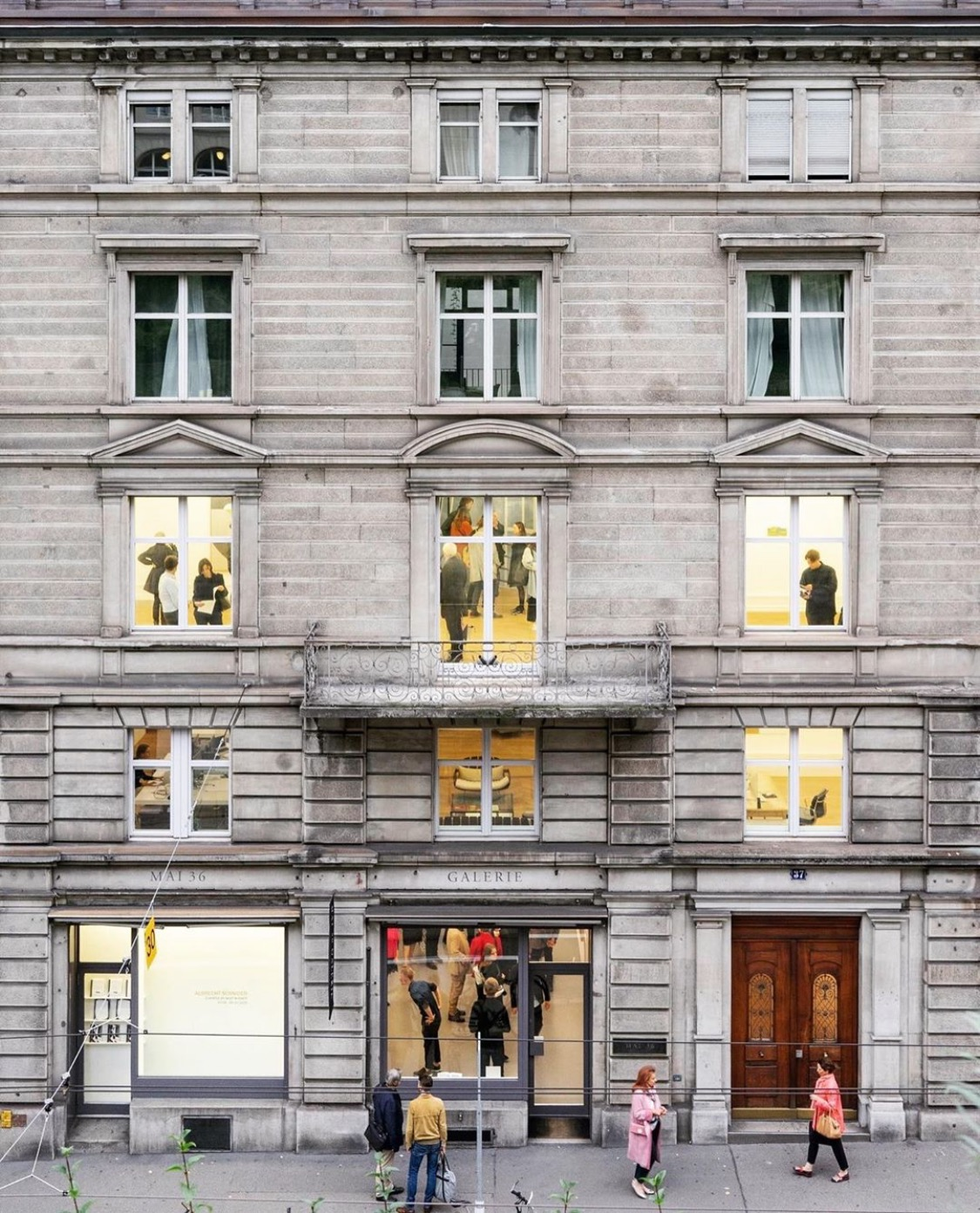
Mai 36 Galerie in Zurich

Mai 36 Galerie is an international contemporary art gallery, located in Zürich. The gallery was founded in 1987 by Victor Gisler.

== History ==
In 1987, Victor Gisler founded Mai 36 Galerie in Lucerne. The opening show was held in February 1988 with Les Levine, on Maihofstrasse 36 in Lucerne.

Since 1996, the gallery is located in the center of Zürich, next to Kunsthaus Zürich. With a focus on text-based art, new media and photography, the gallery showed in the early years of 1988/89 Lawrence Weiner, John Baldessari, Irma Blank, General Idea, Thomas Ruff, Robert Mapplethorpe as well as Ian Anüll, Christoph Rütimann and Rémy Zaugg. With these artists, Mai 36 developed a profile that has distinguished itself since its inception through a critical examination of art, politics, society and the mass media.

In 1990, Mai 36 Galerie participated at Art Basel for the first time. Victor Gisler has served as a member of the Art Basel Committee for 12 years.

== Exhibition program ==
Mai 36 Galerie presents and promotes the work of emerging and established international contemporary artists. For more than 25 years, Mai 36 Galerie has been working with John Baldessari, Stephan Balkenhol, Troy Brauntuch, Pia Fries, Matt Mullican, Christoph Rütimann, Thomas Ruff, and Lawrence Weiner.

The exhibition program of Mai 36 Galerie features the works of artists dealing with fundamental questions of artistic expression. Their points of departure are significant post–World War II statements, with their roots going back to the 1960s and 1970s (especially pop art, minimal art, and conceptual art). The gallery strives to work in close collaboration with the artists and presents their works continuously in individual exhibitions, publications, as well as at international art fairs such as Art Basel, Art Basel Hong Kong, Art Basel Miami, Fiac Paris, Arco Madrid, Frieze Art Fair London and Zona Maco Mexico City. The gallery hosts approximately six solo shows a year and various group shows across the three-story gallery space.
