= Florian Süssmayr =

German painter from Munich (born 1963)

Florian Süssmayr (born 1963 in Munich) is a German painter from Munich. In the 1980th Süssmayr was involved in the punk scene and member of a punk band. In the 1990th he was working as a lighting technician and cinematographer. In doing so he was involved in the production of the movies Am I Beautiful? and Deathmaker amongst others. Since 1997 he devoted himself to the art of oil painting. His works can be found in galleries in Munich, Tokyo and New York. For the motion picture A Year Ago in Winter he provided the portray of Karoline Herfurth which is central for the plot.

== Published books ==
- Süssmayr, Florian (2006), Bilder für Deutsche Museen: Buch zur Ausstellung in München (in German), Cologne: Verlag der Buchhandlung König, ISBN 978-3-86560-068-4
