= Lawrence Weiner =

American artist (1942–2021)

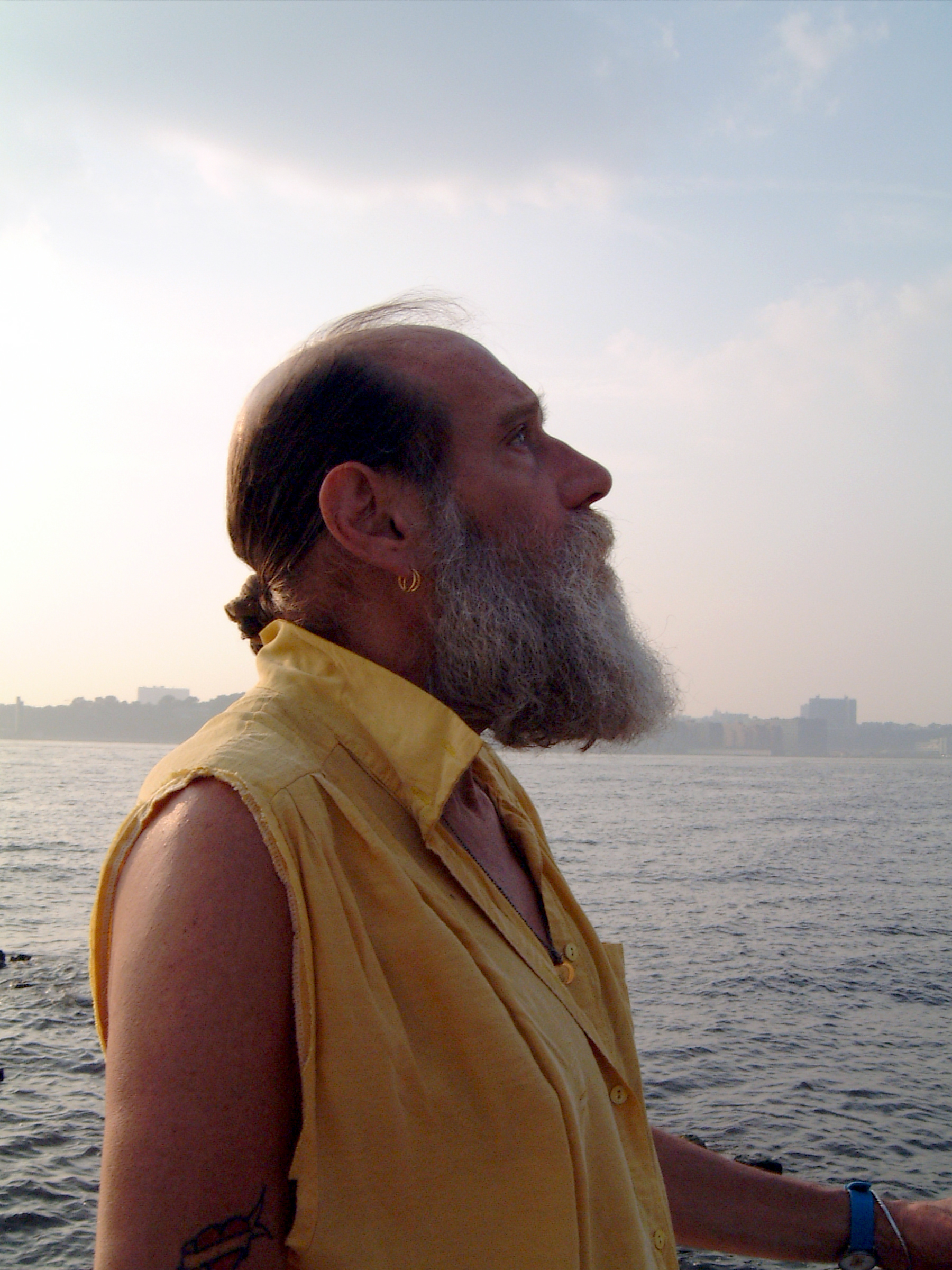
- Lawrence Weiner in 2003 photographed by Alice Zimmerman Weiner
- Born: Lawrence Charles Weiner; February 10, 1942; New York City, US
- Died: December 2, 2021 (aged 79); New York City, US
- Known for: Conceptual art

Lawrence Charles Weiner (February 10, 1942 – December 2, 2021) was an artist born and raised in New York City. One of the central figures in the formation of Conceptual Art in the 1960s, Lawrence Weiner explored the potentials of language as a sculptural medium. For him language could be presented in any format able to discourse with typical art subjects such as: language installed on a wall, printed as text in a book or catalog, spoken or performed in a film, spoken aloud in conversation, simply remembered, et cetera; as Lawrence explains in 1970:

"As to construction please remember that... there is no correct way to construct the piece as there is no incorrect way to construct it. If the piece is built it constitutes not how the piece looks but only how it could look."

Weiner divided his time between his studio practice in New York City and his boat, The 'Joma' in Amsterdam. He believed in the importance of making his work non-metaphorical. His goal was to give his viewers the opportunity to use the work towards their own ends. He attempted to make work that crosses cultural boundaries and defines cultural distinctions while the work is frequently translated to suit the idea of place anywhere in world. He participated in public and private projects in the new and old world maintaining that:

"ART IS NOT A METAPHOR UPON THE RELATIONSHIPS OF HUMAN BEINGS TO OBJECTS & OBJECTS TO OBJECTS IN RELATION TO HUMAN BEINGS BUT A REPRESENTATION OF AN EMPIRICAL EXISTING FACT"

== Early life ==
Lawrence Weiner was born premature in Manhattan, to Toba Horowitz and Harold Weiner. He grew up in The Bronx, where his parents owned a candy store. In 1958, he graduated from Stuyvesant High School early at 16, and went on to study philosophy and literature at Hunter College for less than a year. He traveled throughout Mexico, America, and Canada before eventually returning to New York City in the mid-sixties.

== Early career (1960–1970) ==
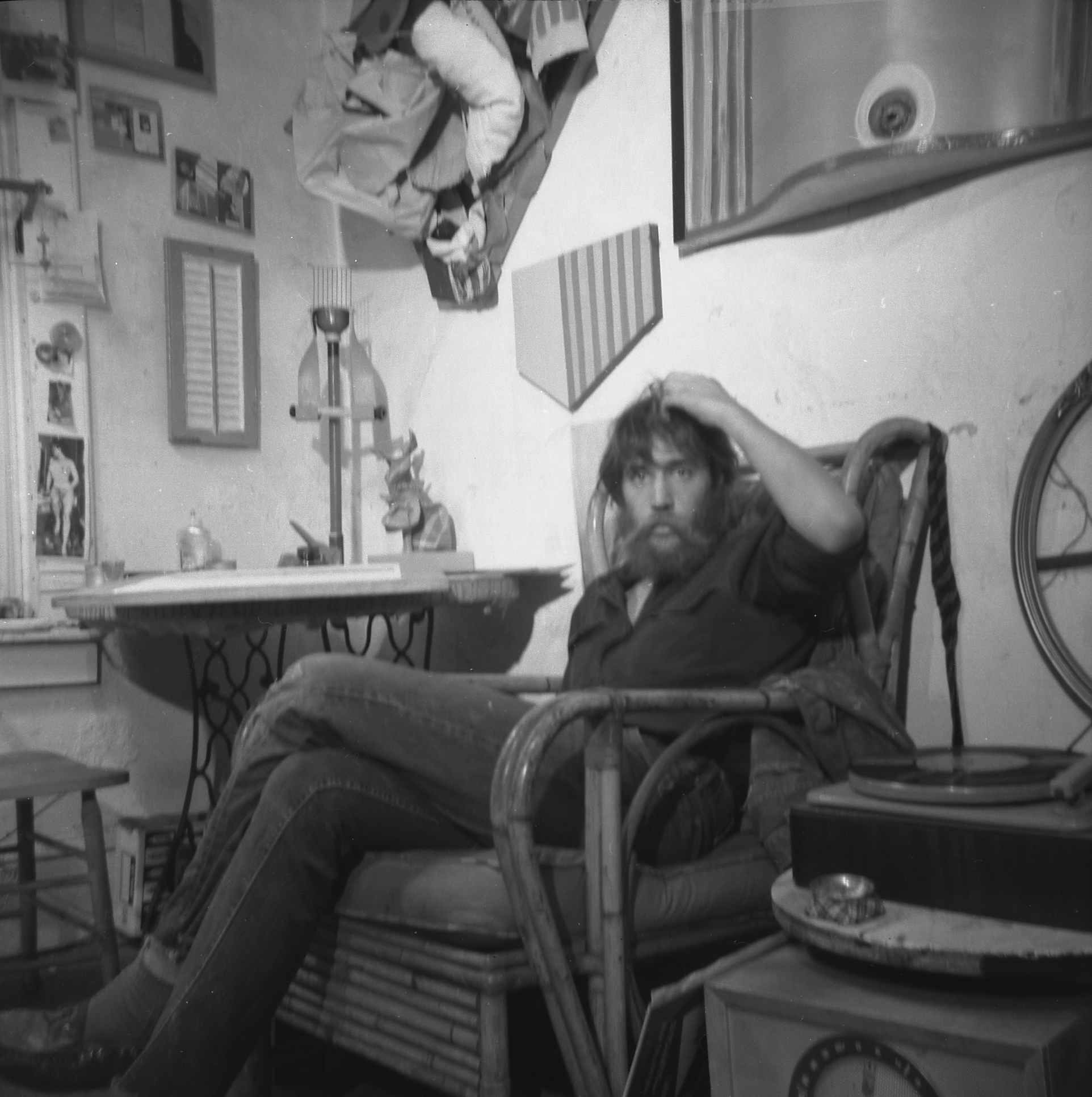
Lawrence Weiner at his studio on Bleecker Street in the 1960s

Before he began to use language as a sculptural medium, Weiner produced two distinct series of paintings in the 1960s which he exhibited with Seth Siegelaub: Propellor Paintings (1964-1966) and Removal Paintings (1966-1968). These painting series were concerned with “idea of painting rather than a painting”, but are still inherently bound to the physical constraints of a specific object, a paradoxical issue. Weiner’s sculpture STAPLES, STAKES, TWINE, TURF produced for the outdoor group exhibition "Carl Andre, Robert Barry, Lawrence Weiner" at Windham College in 1968 instigated a seminal revision of Weiner’s work. The sculpture was destroyed by the group to which the work was addressed—the students—as it was an imposition on their space. Alice Zimmerman Weiner recounts that the “work had trespassed a boundary that Weiner had not been aware of and prompted him “to reflect on the implications of imposing structures on an unknown public”. Weiner later declared that:

“A REASONABLE ASSUMPTION SEEMS TO BE THAT / PROLONGED NEGOTIATIONS WITH A NON- / ACCOMMODATING STRUCTURE IS NOT THE ROLE / & / OR USE OF THE ARTIST OR THE ART.”.

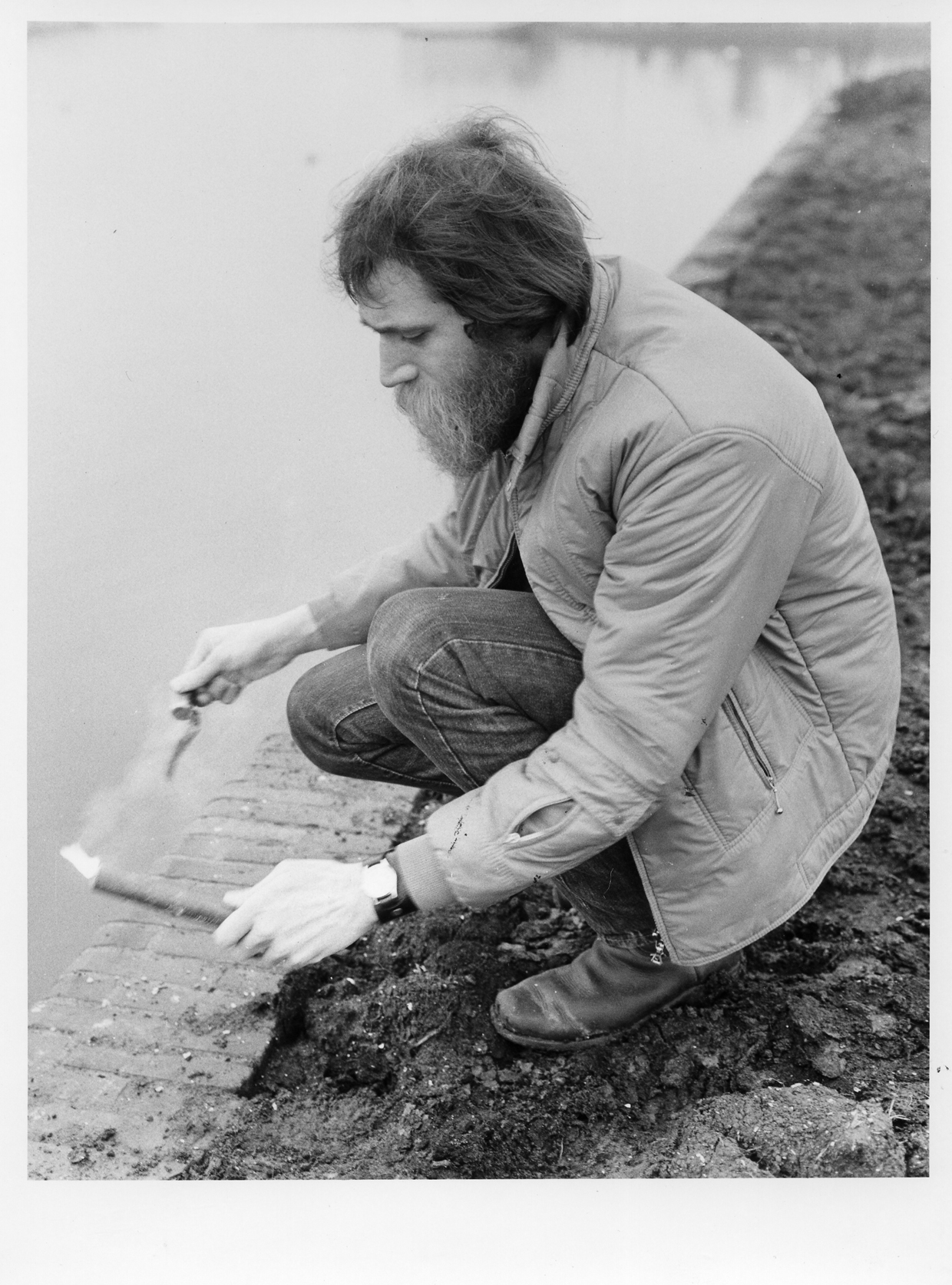
Lawrence Weiner constructing his work, THE RESIDUE OF A FLARE IGNITED UPON A BOUNDARY (1969) in Amsterdam

This incident prompted Weiner to realize that an artwork need not impose on physical space at all and Weiner began to utilize language as a primary material—the work “had become a manifestation of ‘language + the materials referred to’”. Weiner asserted that by utilizing language, “there is no edge that the picture drops over or drops off. You are dealing with something completely infinite.”. Joseph Kosuth stated that Weiner “changed his notion of ‘place’… from the context of the canvas (which could only be specific) to a context which was ‘general’, yet all the while continuing his concern with specific materials and processes.”.

From 1968 onwards, Weiner’s work operated under the conditions dictated by the "Declaration of Intent", first presented in the magazine Art News in the fall of 1968 and in the "January 5–31, 1969" exhibition catalog. The "Declaration of Intent" often accompanies a presentation of Weiner's work:

1. THE ARTIST MAY CONSTRUCT THE PIECE

2. THE PIECE MAY BE FABRICATED

3. THE PIECE NEED NOT BE BUILT

EACH BEING EQUAL AND CONSISTENT WITH THE INTENT OF THE ARTIST THE DECISION AS TO CONDITION RESTS WITH THE RECEIVER UPON THE OCCASION OF RECEIVERSHIP

The first condition recalls the traditional relationship between the artist and the artwork. The second condition permits the work to be ‘fabricated’ by someone other than the artist. Finally, the work does not need to be acted upon at all, it can simply exist as language or an idea to function as art. Weiner uses the general term ‘receiver’ for any individual, collector, gallery, or museum who accepted the responsibility of ownership under these conditions. Weiner utilized this tripartite declaration as the framework for all of his work until his death in 2021.

== Artist's books ==
Weiner has extensively used the format of the artist book to disseminate his work. The format is integral to his practice. In 1976, Weiner asserted:

“THEY (BOOKS) ARE PERHAPS THE LEAST IMPOSITIONAL MEANS OF TRANSFERRING / INFORMATION FROM ONE TO ANOTHER (SOURCE)”.

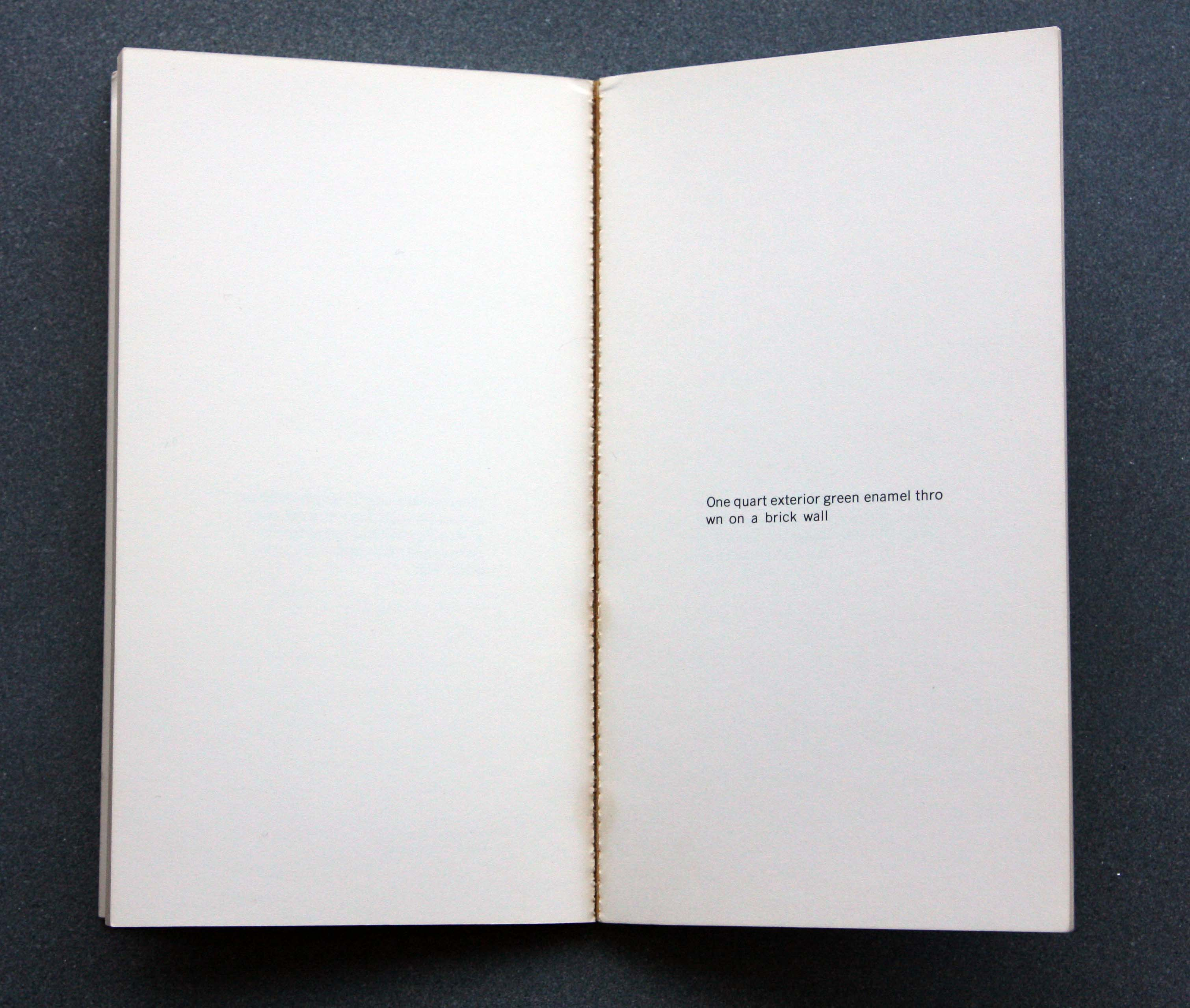
Page-spread of "Statements", ONE QUART GREEN EXTERIOR ENAMEL THROWN ON A BRICK WALL, Lawrence Weiner, 1968

Weiner's first body of work produced using language was the solo-exhibition "Statements", an artist's book published in December 1968 by The Louis Kellner Foundation and Seth Siegelaub. Statements consists of twenty-four works, condensed linguistic statements that describe sculptural processes and common materials of production. In an interview with Benjamin Buchloh, Weiner asserted that the work in Statements is “decidedly non-macho, but [turns] out to be the tough guy in the bar.”.

== Exhibitions ==
A comprehensive retrospective of Weiner's career was organized by Ann Goldstein and Donna De Salvo at the Museum of Contemporary Art, Los Angeles (MOCA) and the Whitney Museum of American Art, New York in 2007–2008. Major solo exhibitions of the artist's work have been hosted at the Stedelijk Museum Amsterdam (1988/89), Hirshhorn Museum and Sculpture Garden, Washington, D.C. (1990), Institute of Contemporary Arts, London (1991), Dia Center for the Arts, New York (1991), Musée d'Art Contemporain, Bordeaux (1991/92), San Francisco Museum of Modern Art (1992), The Arnhem (Sonsbeek) The Netherlands (1993) Walker Art Center, Minneapolis (1994), Philadelphia Museum of Art (1994), Museum Ludwig, Cologne (1995), Deutsche Guggenheim in Berlin (2000), Museo Tamayo Arte Contemporáneo in Mexico City (2004), Tate Gallery in London (2006), The Jewish Museum, NY (2012), Kunsthaus Bregenz, Austria (2016), and the Nivola Museum, Orani, Italy (2019).

He participated in Documenta V (1972), VI (1977), VII (1982) and XXIII (2012). He participated in the Venice Biennale in 1972, 1984, 2003, and 2013.

=== Selected solo-exhibitions ===
- 2024, "A PURSUIT OF HAPPINESS ASAP", UCCA Center for Contemporary Art, Beijing
- 2024, "OF & ABOUT POSTERS: The Lawrence Weiner Posters Archive (1965 - 2021)", Vancouver Art Gallery, Vancouver
- 2023, "UNDER THE SUN", AmorePacific Museum of Art (APMA), Seoul
- 2023, "Artists Rooms: Lawrence Weiner", Tate Modern, London, UK
- 2023, "LAWRENCE WEINER: WITHIN A REALM OF RELATIVE FORM", Lisson Gallery, Beijing
- 2022, "AS LONG AS IT LASTS", Mai 36, Zurich
- 2022, "APROPOS LAWRENCE WEINER", Marian Goodman Gallery, NYC
- 2021, "AROUND THE WORLD", Cristina Guerra Contemporary Art, Lisbon
- 2021, "CLOSE TO A RAINBOW", Holstebro Kunstmuseum, Holstebro
- 2020, "TRACCE/TRACES", Museo di Arte Contemporanea di Roma, Rome
- 2020, "ON VIEW", Regen Projects, Los Angeles
- 2019, "ATTACHED BY EBB & FLOW", Museo Nivola, Orani
- 2019, "LONG AGO FAR AWAY", OSL Contemporary, Oslo
- 2018, "WATER & SOME OF ITS FORMS", Taro Nasu Gallery, Tokyo
- 2017, "LAWRENCE WEINER: INHERENT INNATE TENSION", Milwaukee Art Museum, Milwaukee
- 2016, "WHEREWITHAL | WAS ES BRAUCHT", Kunsthaus Bregenz, Bregenz, Austria
- 2015, "WITHIN A REALM OF DISTANCE", Blenheim Art Foundation, Oxfordshire
- 2015, "Straight Down to Below: Lawrence Weiner ", Artist Rooms on Tour at Tate Modern and National Galleries of Scotland), Woodhorn Museum, Northumberland, Scotland
- 2014, "Lawrence Weiner: ALL IN DUE COURSE", South London Gallery, London
- 2014, "CRISCROSSED ENTRECUZADO", Cristina Guerra Contemporary Art, Lisbon
- 2013 - 2014, "Lawrence Weiner: WRITTEN IN THE WIND", Stedelijk Museum, Amsterdam
- 2012, "BE THAT AS IT MAY", Lisson Gallery, London
- 2012, "Lawrence Weiner: NO TREE NO BRANCH", The Jewish Museum, New York
- 2011, "A SYNTAX OF DEPENDENCY" (with Liam Gillick), Museum of Contemporary Art Antwerp, Belgium
- 2010, "AS TO BE IN PLAIN SIGHT", Denver Art Museum, Colorado
- 2010, "GYROSCOPICALLY SPEAKING", Marian Goodman Gallery, New York
- 2010, "Lawrence Weiner in the House of Art", České Budějovice, Czech Republic
- 2008, "LAWRENCE WEINER: QUID PRO QUO", Gagosian Gallery, Rome
- 2008, "OFFSIDES", Lisson Gallery, London
- 2008 "A SELECTION OF SHORT FILMS AND VIDEOS BY LAWRENCE WEINER", UCCA Center for Contemporary Art, Beijing
- 2008, "DEMATERIALIZING CINEMA-THE FILMS OF LAWRENCE WEINER" Harvard Film Archive, Carpenter Center for the Visual Arts, Boston
- 2007 - 2008, "Lawrence Weiner: AS FAR AS THE EYE CAN SEE", at the Whitney Museum of American Art, New York
- 2007, "Lawrence Weiner: Inherent in the Rhumb Line", at National Maritime Museum, Greenwich, England
- 2005, "WITHIN A REALM OF RELATIVE FORM", Lisson Gallery, London
- 2004, "WITH ALL DUE INTENT", Cristina Guerra Contemporary Art, Lisbon
- 2003, "LE DESTIN LA DESTINÉE", Yvon Lambert, Paris
- 2000, "UNDER THE APPLE TREE", Galleria Massimo De Carlo, Milan, Italy
- 1998, "WRITTEN ON THE WIND", Kunsthalle Nürnberg, Germany
- 1997, "TOWARDS MOTION", Canary Wharf, London.
- 1996, "BADLY MIXED CONCRETE", Galerie Hubert Winter, Vienna
- 1995, "TO BUILD A SQUARE IN THE RHINELAND", Wolfgang Hahn Prize, Museum Ludwig, Cologne
- 1995, "LEARN TO READ ART: Lawrence Weiner - The Books", New York Public Library, New York
- 1993, "SPECIFIC & GENERAL WORKS. 1968 - SEPT. 1993" Le Nouveau Musée/Institut d'Art Contemporain, Villeurbanne
- 1993, "AS LONG AS IT LASTS", Gallery 360°, Tokyo
- 1992, "CHAINS WRAPPED AROUND ONE THING & ANOTHER BROKEN ONE BY ONE WITH THE PASSAGE OF TIME", San Francisco Museum of Modern Art, San Francisco
- 1991, "DISPLACEMENT", Dia Center for the Arts, New York
- 1991, "DROPPED STONES", Leo Castelli Gallery, New York
- 1991, "SPHERES OF INFLUENCE", Institute of Contemporary Arts, London
- 1990, "WITH THE PASSAGE OF TIME", Hirshhorn Museum and Sculpture Garden, Smithsonian Institution, Washington, D.C.
- 1988, "LAWRENCE WEINER WORKS FROM THE BEGINNING OF THE SIXTIES TOWARDS THE END OF THE EIGHTIES", Stedelijk Museum, Amsterdam
- 1985, "Sculpture", Musée d'Art Moderne de la Ville de Paris / ARC, Paris
- 1983, "The Lawrence Weiner Poster Archive", Anna Leonowens Gallery, Nova Scotia College of Art and Design, Halifax
- 1983, "WORKS + RECONSTRUCTIONS", Kunsthalle Bern
- 1980, "Lawrence Weiner", Centre d'Art Contemporain, Geneva
- 1977, "THREE WORKS OF LAWRENCE WEINER PRESENTED FOR SALE &/OR INFORMATION AT LEO CASTELLI NYC", Leo Castelli Gallery, New York
- 1976, "FIVE WORKS, ONE BOOK, ONE VIDEOTAPE", Institute of Contemporary Arts, London
- 1976, "A PROPOSITION + SOME QUESTIONS AS TO MOVED PICTURES", Artists Space, New York
- 1973, "WITH RELATION TO THE VARIOUS MANNERS WITH VARIOUS THINGS", Jack Wendler Gallery, London
- 1970, "Lawrence Weiner", Yvon Lambert, Paris
- 1969, "5 WORKS" Anna Leonowens Gallery, Nova Scotia College of Art Design, Halifax
- 1968, "STATEMENTS", Seth Siegelaub Contemporary Art and The Louis Kellner Foundation
- 1960, "CRATERING PIECE", Mill Valley, California

== Recognition ==
Among his many honors were National Endowment for the Arts Fellowships (1976 and 1983), a Guggenheim Fellowship (1994), Wolfgang Hahn Prize (1995), a Skowhegan Medal for Painting/Conceptual Art (1999), An Honorary Doctorate of Humane Letters from the Graduate Center, City University of New York City, (2013), the Roswitha Haftmann Prize, Zurich, Switzerland (2015), and the Aspen Award for Art (2017). He posthumously won the Oskar-Kokoschka-Prize in Vienna (2022).

On the occasion of the Drawing Center's 2012 Spring Gala, where Weiner was being honored for his contributions to contemporary art, fellow artist Ed Ruscha and Mason Williams created a three-minute tribute in the form of a parody of Bob Dylan's legendary music video for "Subterranean Homesick Blues" with placards featuring Weiner text pieces like "stars don't stand still in the sky" and "water in milk exists."

=== Honors, prizes, awards, grants, and fellowships include ===
Oskar Kokoschka Prize, Vienna (2022); Tokyo TDC (Type Directors Club) Annual Awards, Book Design Prize (2020); Bomb Magazine Anniversary Gala Hornoree (2020); Artist X Artist Hirshhorn Museum Gala Honoree (2019); SCAD deFINE ART Honoree, Savannah, Georgia (2019); Free Arts Honoree, New York (2018); Wolf Foundation Prize, Jerusalem (2017); Aspen Art Museum Award for Art (2017); The Kitchen Honoree, New York (2017); D.U.C. / Distribution to Underserved Communities Library Program) Honoree (2017); Roswitha Haftmann Prize, Kunsthaus Zurich (2015); Honorary Doctorate of Humane Letters, The Graduate Center City University of New York (2013); The Drawing Center Spring Gala Honoree, New York (2012); Bronx Museum of the Arts Honoree, New York City (2011); Skowhegan Medal for Painting/Conceptual (1999); Wolfgang Hahn Prize, Ludwig Museum, Köln (1995); John Simon Guggenheim Fellowship (1994); Arthur Köpcke Prize, Arthur Köpcke Memorial Fund, Copenhagen (1991); Singer Prize, Singer Museum, Laren, The Netherlands (1988); NEA Fellowship (1983); Stichting De Appel, Amsterdam & the State Film Board of the Netherlands (1982); NEA Fellowship (1976); 72nd American Exhibition, The Art Institute of Chicago (1976); DAAD, Berlin (1975-1976)

== Film & Video (Television) ==
Weiner produced film and video works throughout his entire life. It is both a framework for his existing work to operate within and a work in its own right. Weiner distinguished between 'film' and 'video', but produced both in parallel; As Dieter Schwartz writes in SHOW (&) TELL: The Films & Videos of Lawrence Weiner, "The ease of production of the video allows for real time to be rapidly converted to edited, cinematic time, whereas film can only be viewed after a complicated processing stage, which automatically makes the recorded events more distant.".

=== Film ===
- 1973, '"A FIRST QUARTER", 85 minutes
- 1974, "DONE TO", 20 minutes
- 1975, "A SECOND QUARTER", 85 minutes
- 1979, "ALTERED TO SUIT", 23 minutes
- 1981, "PASSAGE TO THE NORTH", 16 minutes
- 1982, "PLOWMANS LUNCH", 28 minutes
- 1997, "READING LIPS", 11 minutes

=== Video (Television) ===
- 1970, "TO THE SEA/ON THE SEA/FROM THE SEA/AT THE SEA/BORDERING THE SEA", 50 seconds
- 1970, "BEACHED", 2 minutes and 30 seconds
- 1971, "BROKEN OFF", 1 minute and 30 seconds
- 1972, "TO AND FRO. FRO AND TO. AND TO AND FRO. AND FRO AND TO.", 1 minute
- 1972, "SHIFTED FROM THE SIDE", 1 minute
- 1974, "AFFECTED AND/OR EFFECTED", 20 minutes
- 1975/1976, "GREEN AS WEL AS BLUE AS WELL AS RED", 18 minutes
- 1976, "VARIOUS MANNERS WITH VARIOUS THINGS", 20–30 minutes
- 1976, "DO YOU BELIEVE IN WATER?", 39 minutes
- 1976, "A BIT OF MATTER AND A LITTLE BIT MORE", 23 minutes
- 1977, "FOR EXAMPLE DECORATED", 23 minutes
- 1980, "THERE BUT FOR", 20 minutes
- 1982, "TRAILER FOR PLOWMANS LUNCH", 6 minutes
- 1984, "NEITS ANN VERLOREN/NOTHING TO LOSE", 22 minutes

== Personal life ==
Weiner and his wife Alice Zimmerman Weiner lived on Bleecker Street for over thirty years before moving to another residence and studio in the West Village, in what was once an old laundromat built in 1910, transformed into a five-level town house designed by the firm LOT-EK in 2008.

Weiner died on December 2, 2021, in Manhattan, at the age of 79.

== Suggested further reading ==
HAVING BEEN SAID: Writings & Interviews of Lawrence Weiner

- Fietzek, Gerti and Stemmrich, Gregor. (eds.) Having Been Said: Writings & Interviews of Lawrence Weiner 1968–2003. Ostfildern-Ruit: Hatje Cantz, 2004.

Lawrence Weiner: Books 1968—1989

- Schwarz, Dieter (ed.) Lawrence Weiner: Books 1968–1989. Köln / Villeurbanne: Verlag der Buchhandlung Walther König / Le Nouveau Musée, 1989.

SHOW (&) TELL: The Films and Video of Lawrence Weiner

- Marí, Bartomeu; Fuchs, R. H. (1992). Show (&) tell: the films and video of Lawrence Weiner a catalogue raisonné. Gent: Imschoot. ISBN 978-90-72191-54-0.

Lawrence Weiner

- Alberro, Alexander; Zimmerman, Alice; Buchloch, Benjamin H.D. and Batchelor, David. Lawrence Weiner. London: Phaidon Press, 1998.

Lawrence Weiner: AS FAR AS THE EYE CAN SEE

- De Salvo, Donna and Goldstein, Ann (eds.) Lawrence Weiner: As Far as the Eye Can See. New York: Whitney Museum of American Art, Los Angeles: Museum of Contemporary Art, 2007.

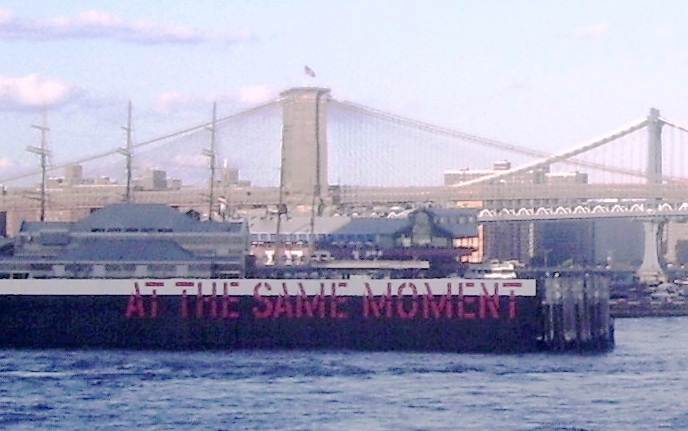
Weiner's At the Same Moment painted on pilings in the East River, as seen in 2011
