= Christoph Rütimann =

Swiss artist (born 1955)

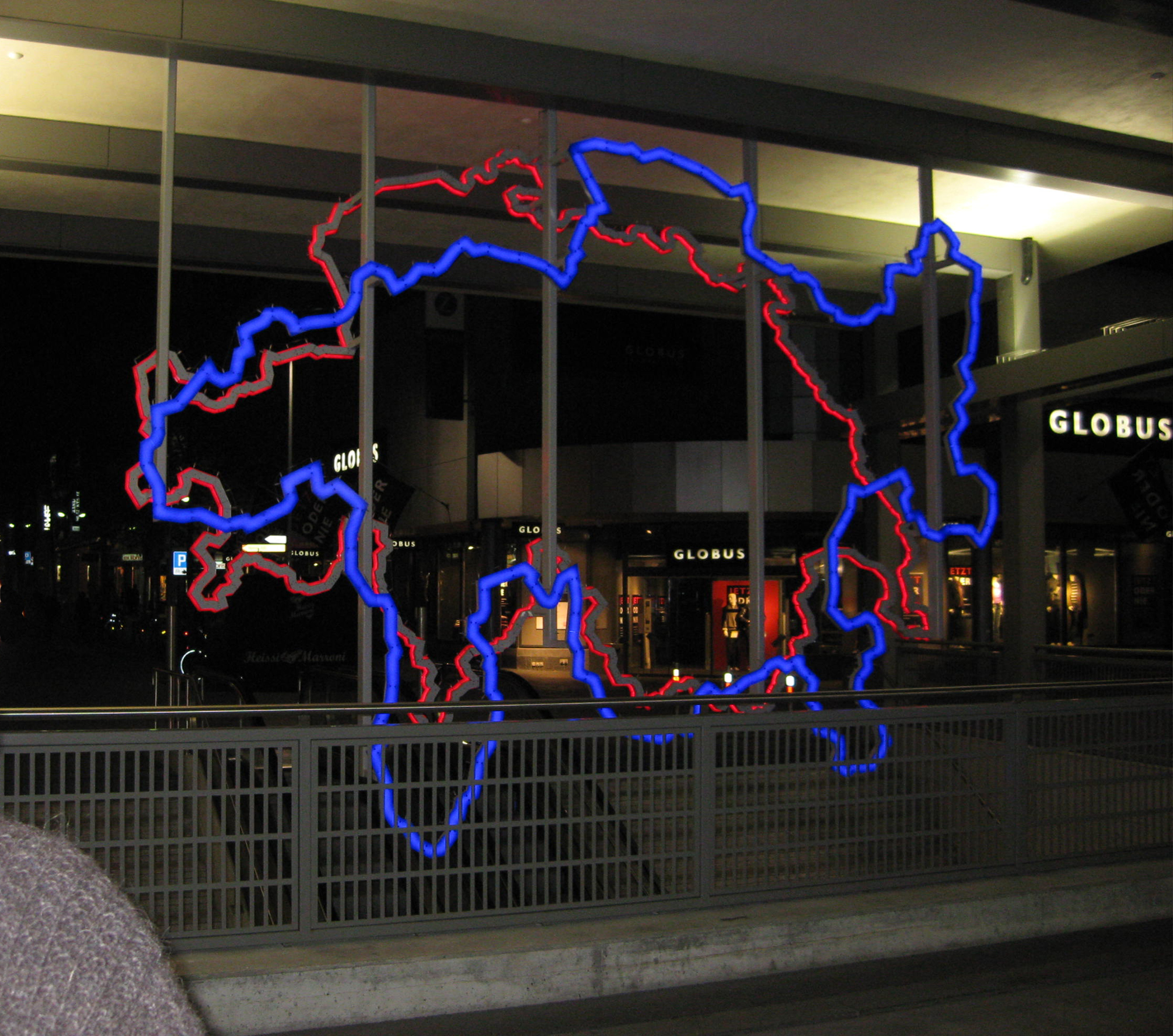
Framework of Borders, installation by Christoph Rütimann in Chur station, Switzerland.

Christoph Rütimann (born 1955) is a Swiss painter. He represented Switzerland in 1993 at the Venice Biennale.

== Awards ==
- 1989: Conrad Ferdinand Meyer Prize
- 2005: International Art Award of Vorarlberg
