= List of food and beverage museums =

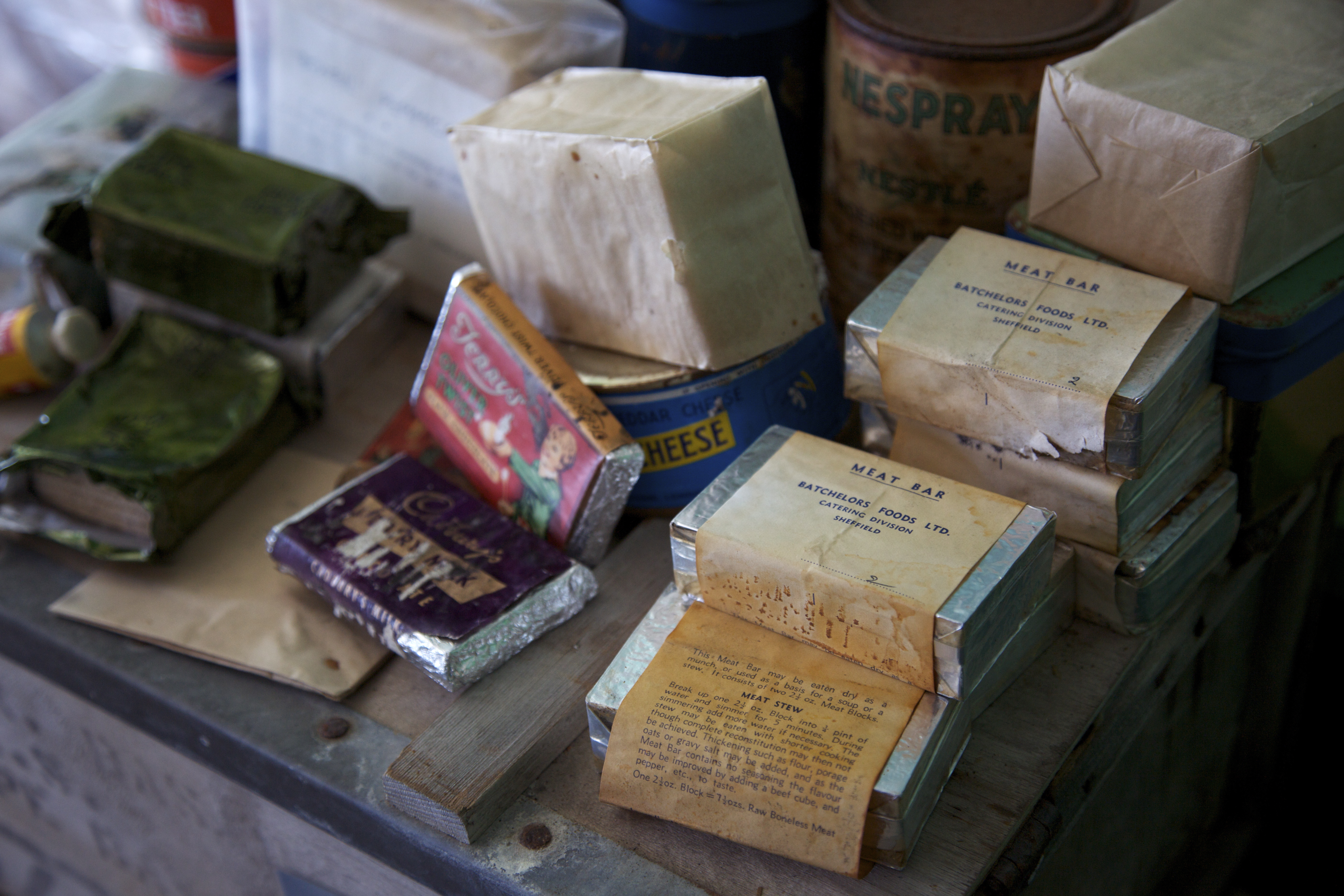
Historic food rations on display in the museum at Port Lockroy, Antarctic Peninsula

This is a list of food and beverage museums. Food museums, beverage museums and wine museums generally provide information about how various foodstuffs are produced or were historically produced. Many of these museums are owned and operated by specific food and beverage production companies.

== Food and beverage museums ==
=== A ===
- Aghdam Bread Museum, Agdam, Azerbaijan
- Agricultural Museum, Cairo, Egypt
- Agropolis, Montpellier, France (closed 2010—operating a website only)
- Aigle Castle, Aigle, Switzerland
- American Institute of Baking, Manhattan, Kansas, US
- Alimentarium, Vevey, Switzerland

=== B ===
- Beer Can Museum, East Taunton, Massachusetts, US
- Biedenharn Museum and Gardens, Monroe, Louisiana, US
- Bochnia Salt Mine, Bochnia, Poland
- Bramah Tea and Coffee Museum, London, England, UK (closed 2008 – operating a website only)
- Bread Museum, Saint Petersburg, Russia
- Bully Hill Vineyards, Hammondsport, New York, US
- Burlingame Museum of Pez Memorabilia, Burlingame, California, US
- Museum of Russian Bread, Moscow, Russia

=== C ===
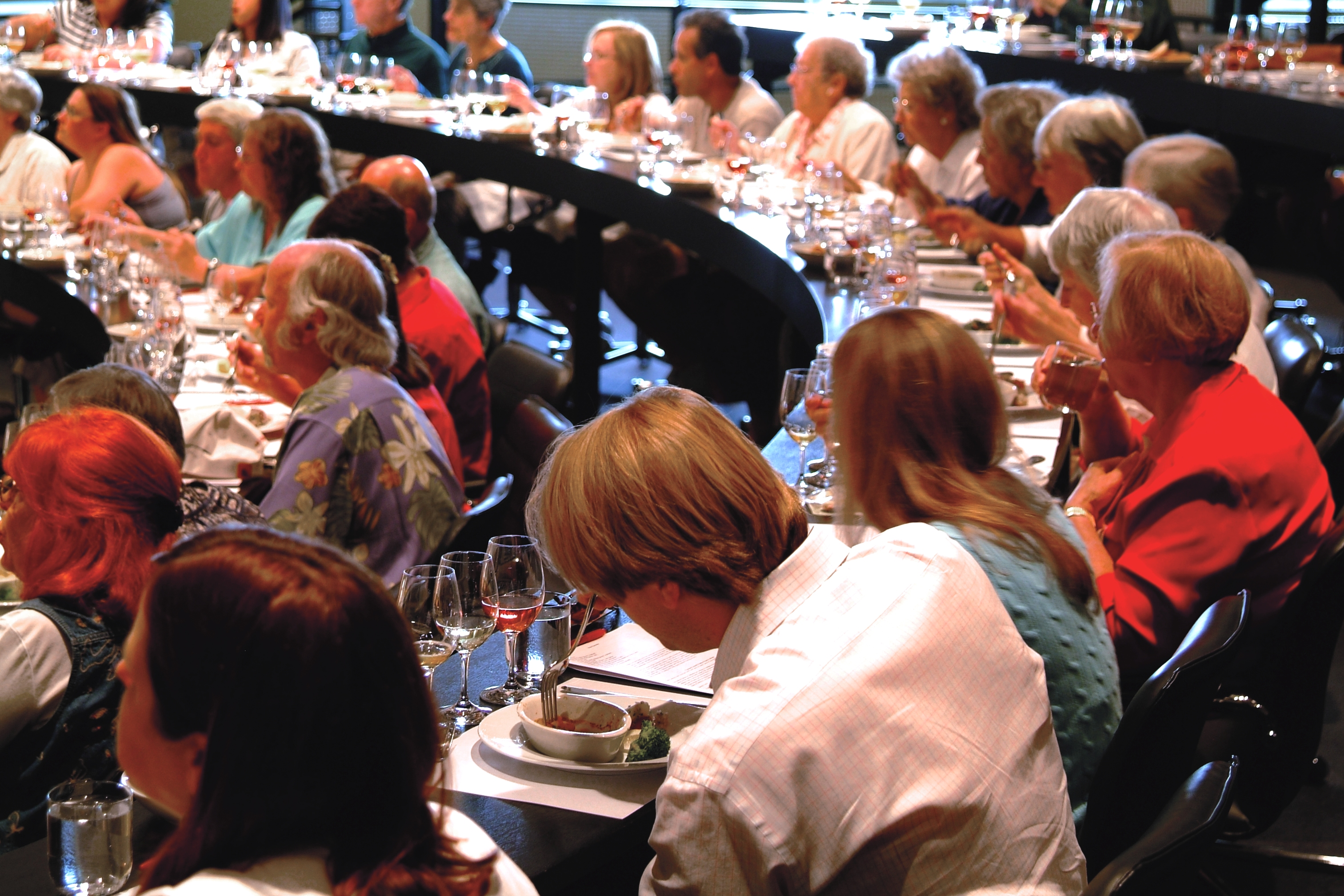
A food and wine pairing seminar at Copia, a former cultural museum and education center in Napa, California, US

- Cadbury World, Birmingham, England, UK and Dunedin, New Zealand
- California Citrus State Historic Park, Riverside, California, US
- Candy Americana Museum, Lititz, Pennsylvania, US
- Cantillon Brewery, Anderlecht, Brussels, Belgium
- Centro Cultural la Azotea, Jocotenango, Guatemala
- China National Tea Museum, Hangzhou, China
- Choco-Story, Bruges, Belgium
- Chocolate Museum (New Brunswick), St. Stephen, New Brunswick, Canada
- Cider Museum, Nava, Spain
- Coca-Cola Museum, Taoyuan City, Taiwan
- Copia, Napa, California, US (closed 2008)
- Cyprus Wine Museum, Erimi, Cyprus

=== D ===
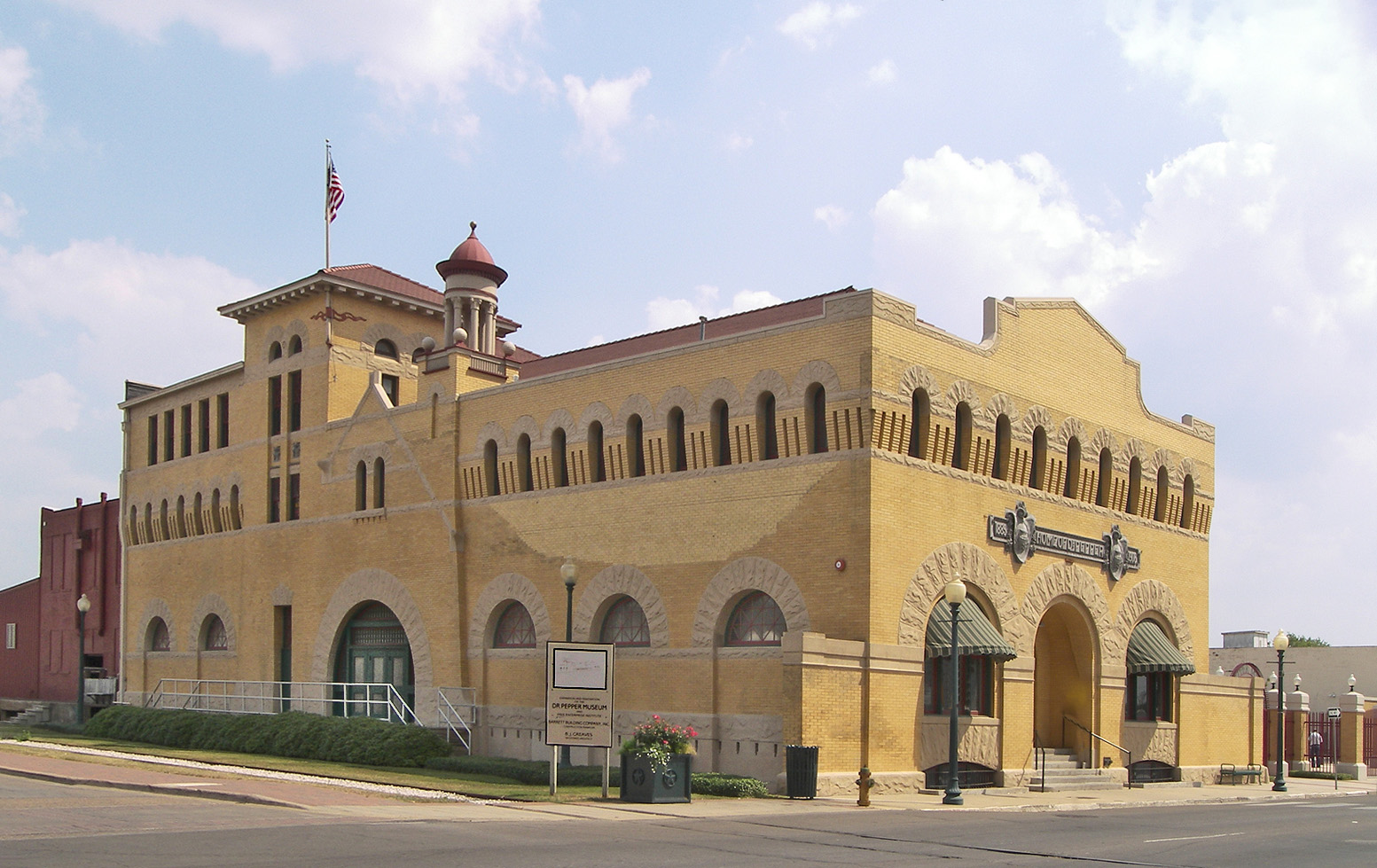
The Dr Pepper Museum in Waco, Texas, is on the National Register of Historic Places.

- Demel, Vienna, Austria
- Desmond Castle, Kinsale, Ireland
- Deutsches Brauereimuseum, Munich, Germany
- Dole Plantation, Wahiawa, Hawaii, US
- Dr Pepper Museum, Waco, Texas, US

=== E ===
- Ethnographic Museum of Dairy, La Foz, Spain
- European Bread Museum, Ebergötzen, Germany

=== F ===
- Food Museum, Thanjavur, India
- Food museum, Taiwan
- Frietmuseum, Bruges, Belgium
- Frietmuseum, Merchtem, Belgium (intended 2006–2008). The whole collection went to Bruges.

=== G ===
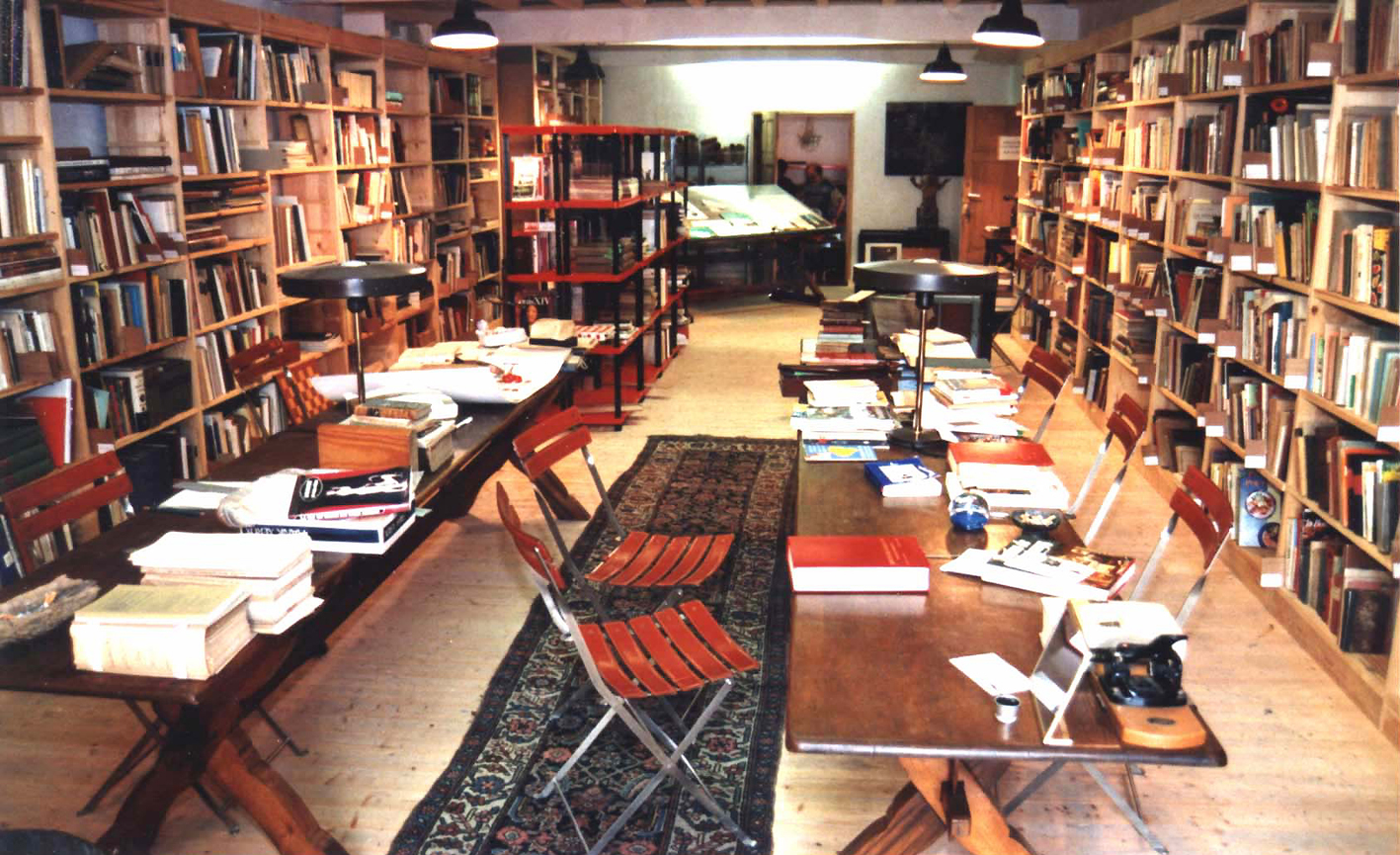
The reading room at the Gourmet Museum and Library in Belgium

- German Salt Museum, Lüneburg, Germany
- Wine and Vine Museum, Naoussa, Greece
- Gingerbread Museum, Toruń, Poland
- Goa Chitra Museum, Benaulim, India
- Gourmet Museum and Library, Hermalle-sous-Huy, Belgium
- Guinness Storehouse, Dublin, Ireland

=== H ===
- Hallein Salt Mine, Hallein, Austria
- Halloren Chocolate Factory, Halle (Saale), Germany
- Hallors and Saline Museum, Halle (Saale), Germany
- Harland Sanders Café and Museum, North Corbin, Kentucky, US
- Hatakeyama Memorial Museum of Fine Art, Tokyo, Japan
- Heineken Experience, Amsterdam, Netherlands
- Hershey's Chocolate World, Hershey, Pennsylvania, US
- Honey Museum, Yunlin, Taiwan
- Hook Norton Brewery, Hook Norton, England, UK
- Hotel and Restaurant Museum, Helsinki, Finland

=== I ===
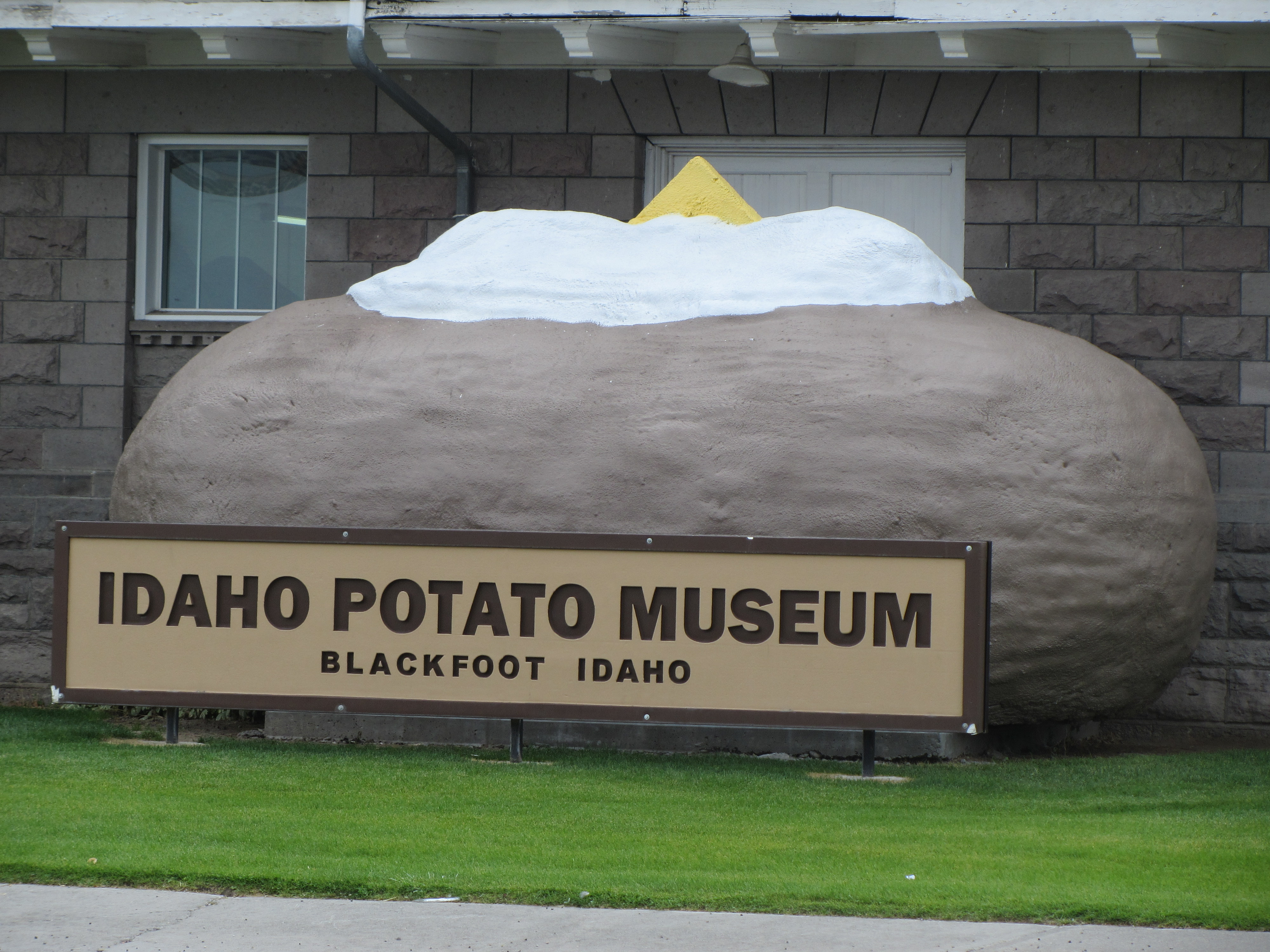
Outside of the Idaho Potato Museum in Blackfoot, Idaho, US

- Idaho Potato Museum, Blackfoot, Idaho, US
- Imhoff-Schokoladenmuseum, Cologne, Germany
- International Museum of Wine, Kinsale, Ireland
- International Vinegar Museum, Roslyn, South Dakota, US

=== J ===
- Jack Daniel Distillery, Lynchburg, Tennessee, US
- Jell-O Gallery, Le Roy, New York, US
- Jelly Belly Candy Company factory, Fairfield, California, US
- Julita Abbey, Oppunda Hundred, Sweden

=== K ===
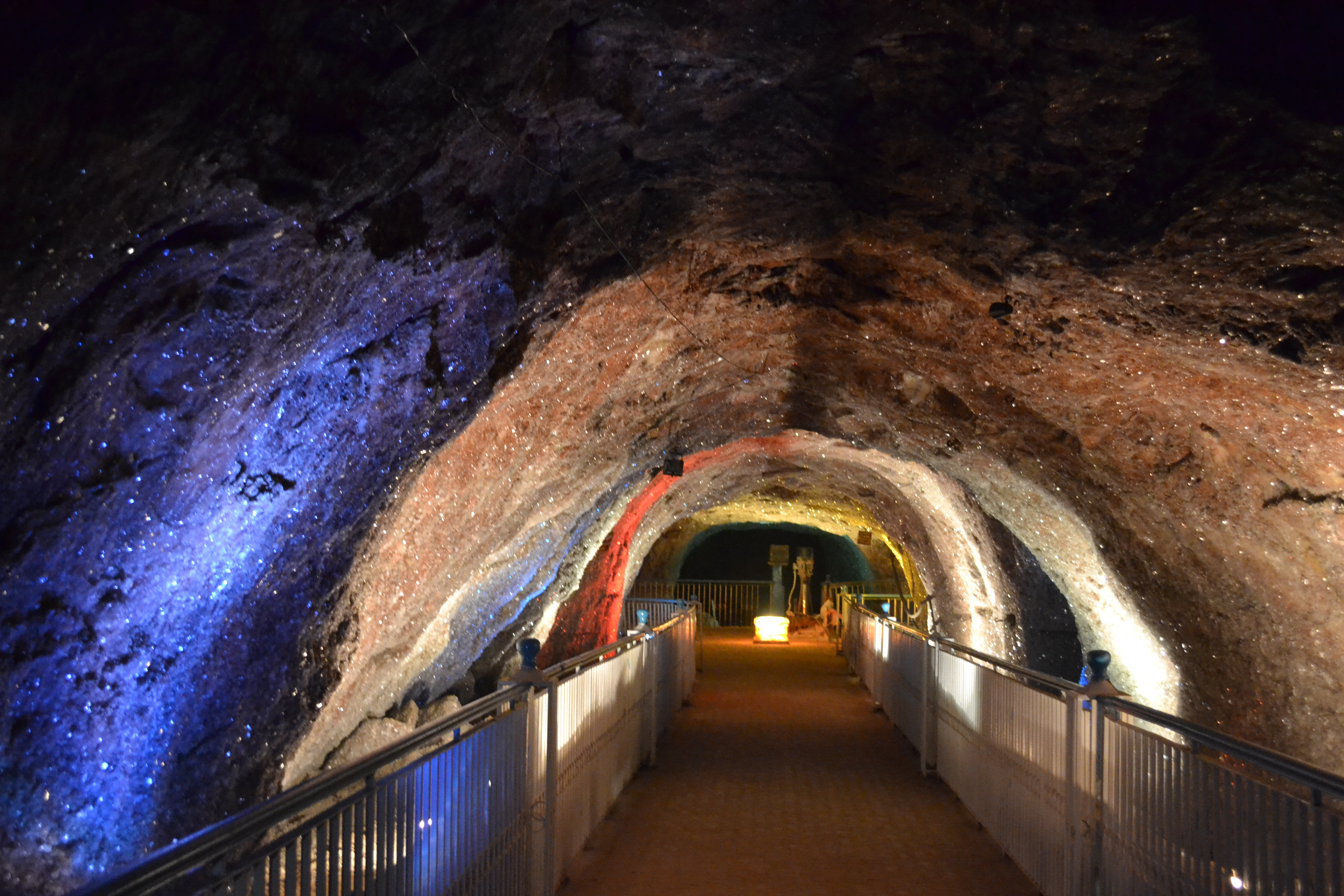
Inside the Khewra Salt Mine tunnel at Khewra, Punjab, Pakistan

- Khewra Salt Mine, Khewra, Pakistan
- Kilbeggan Distillery, Kilbeggan, Ireland
- Kimchi Field Museum, Seoul, South Korea
- Kuo Yuan Ye Museum of Cake and Pastry, Taiwan

=== L ===
- Lion Salt Works, Marston, Cheshire, England, UK
- Lithuanian Museum of Ancient Beekeeping, Stripeikiai, Lithuania
- Lofoten Stockfish Museum, Å, Norway

=== M ===
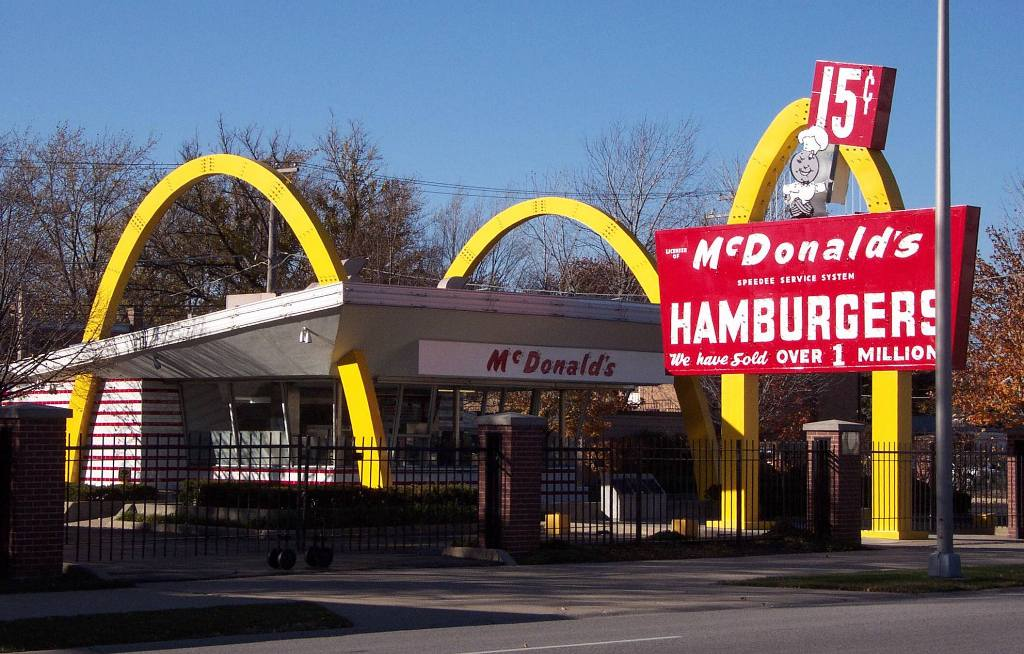
The McDonald's US First Store Museum in Des Plaines, Illinois, US

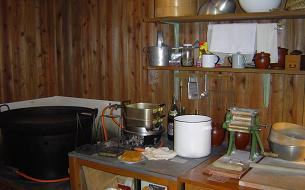
A recreation of Momofuku Ando's workshop at the Momofuku Ando Instant Ramen Museum

- M&M's World, Las Vegas, Nevada, US
- Macau Wine Museum, Macau, China
- The Chios Mastic Museum, Pyrgi, Chios, Greece
- Maritime & Seafood Industry Museum, Biloxi, Mississippi, US
- Marzipan Museum, Szentendr, Hungary
- Mikulov Castle, Mikulov, Czech Republic
- Momofuku Ando Instant Ramen Museum, Ikeda, Osaka, Japan
- Musée "Les secrets du chocolat", Geispolsheim, France
- Musée Chappuis-Fähndrich, Develier, Switzerland
- Musée du Vin, Paris, France
- Musée du Vin et du Négoce de Bordeaux, Bordeaux, France
- Museo del vino (Torgiano), Torgiano, Italy
- Museo dell'olivo e dell'olio, Torgiano, Italy
- Museu de la Xocolata, Barcelona, Spain
- Museum of cacao and chocolate, Brussels, Belgium
- Museum of Chocolate (Pokrov), Pokrov, Vladimir Oblast, Russia
- Museum of Drinking Water, Taipei, Taiwan
- Museum of Food and Drink, Brooklyn, New York, US
- Museum of the Olive and Greek Olive Oil, Sparta, Greece
- Museum of Pasta, Collecchio, Parma, Italy
- Museum of Spirits, Stockholm, Sweden
- Museum of Sugar, Recife, Brazil (closed 1977)
- Museum of Tea Ware, Hong Kong, China
- Museum of Tomato, Collecchio, Parma, Italy

=== N ===
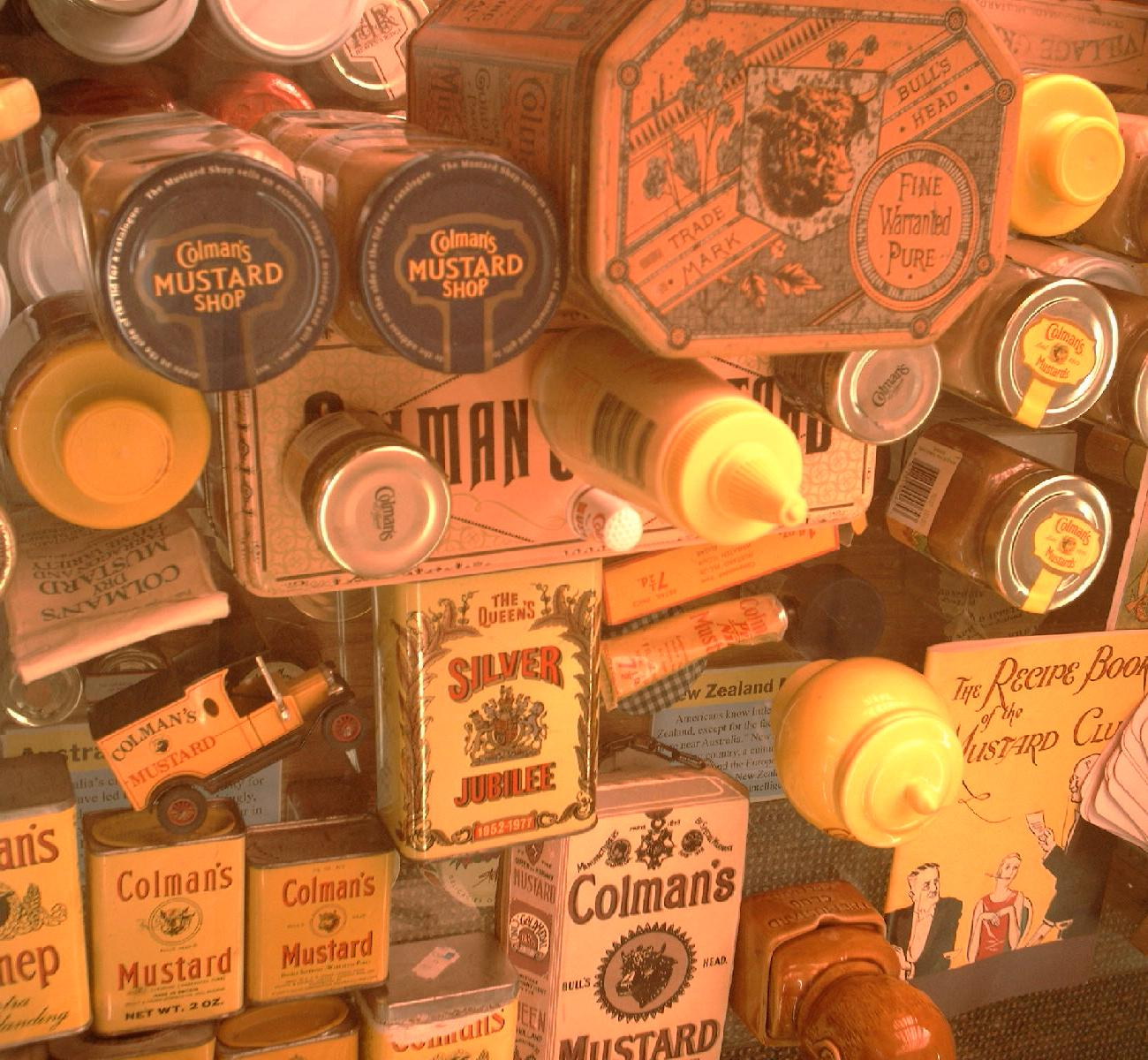
One of the displays at the National Mustard Museum in Middleton, Wisconsin, US

- National Brewery Centre, Burton upon Trent, England, UK (closed 2022)
- National Coffee Park, Quindío Department, Colombia
- National Dairy Shrine, Fort Atkinson, Wisconsin, US
- National Museum of Agriculture in Szreniawa, Szreniawa, Poland
- National Museum of Pasta Foods, Rome, Italy
- National Mustard Museum, Middleton, Wisconsin, US

=== O ===
- Oldest McDonald's restaurant, Downey, California, US
- Onondaga Lake Park, Liverpool, New York, US
- Oscar Getz Museum of Whiskey History, Bardstown, Kentucky, US

=== P ===
- PEZ Visitor Center, Orange, Connecticut, US
- Ping Huang Coffee Museum, Taibao City, Taiwan
- Ping-Lin Tea Museum, New Taipei City, Taiwan
- Poli Grappa Museum, Bassano del Grappa, Italy
- Potato Museum, Albuquerque, New Mexico, US
- Potosi Brewery, Potosi, Wisconsin, US

=== R ===
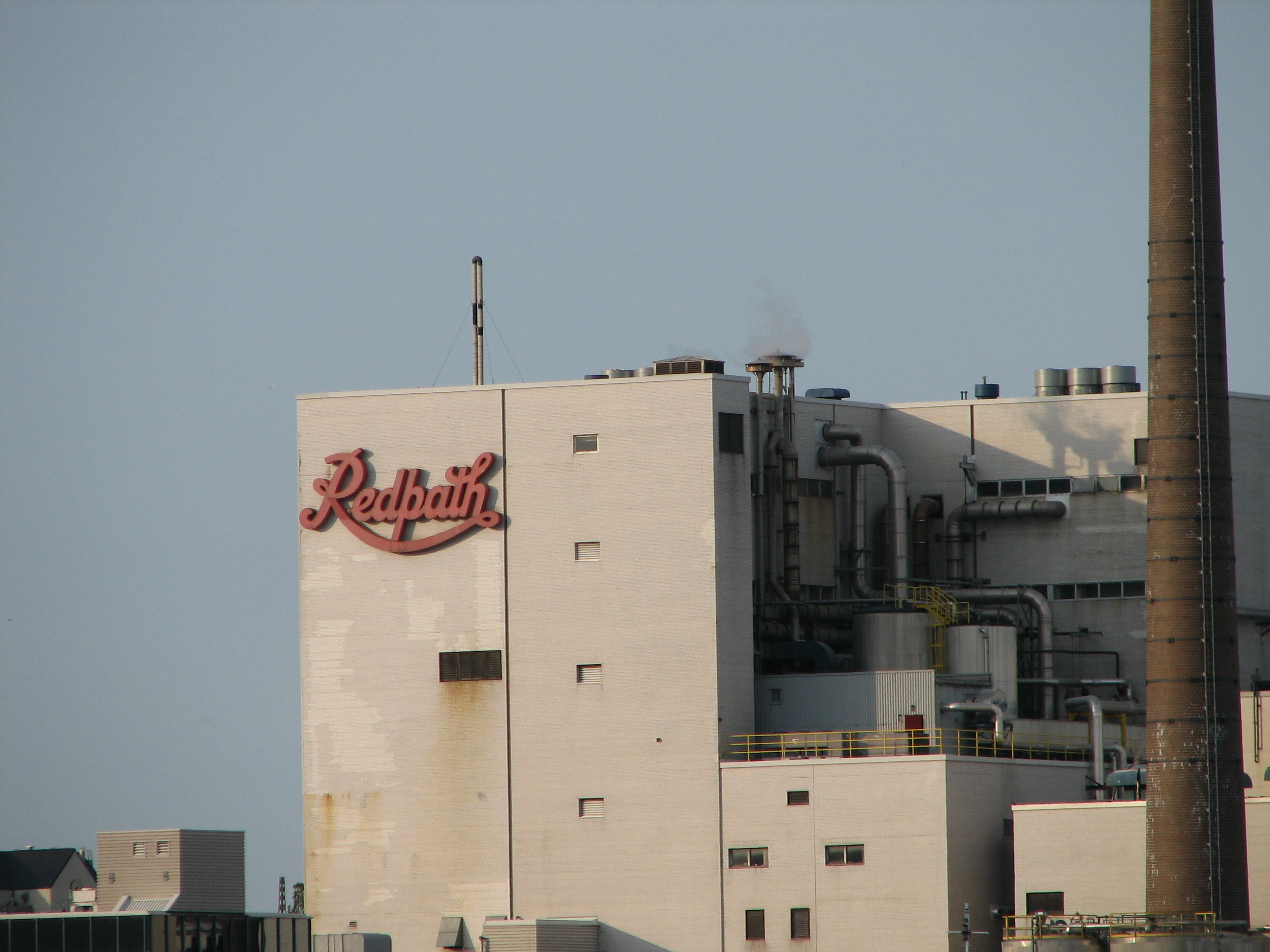
Redpath Sugar Refinery and museum in Toronto, Canada

- Redpath Sugar Refinery, Toronto, Ontario, Canada
- Riserva naturale integrale Saline di Trapani e Paceco, Province of Trapani, Italy
- Royal Saltworks at Arc-et-Senans, Arc-et-Senans, France

=== S ===
- SAB World of Beer, Johannesburg, South Africa
- Sally Lunn's House, Bath, England
- Sapporo Beer Museum, Sapporo, Japan
- Schimpff's Confectionery, Jeffersonville, Indiana, US
- Schloss Esterházy Wine Museum, Eisenstadt, Austria
- Schloss Stainz, Stainz, Austria
- Serbian Museum of Bread - Jeremija, Pećinci, Serbia
- Small Carpathian Museum, Bratislava, Slovakia
- Southern Food and Beverage Museum, New Orleans, Louisiana, US
- Soya-Mixed Meat Museum, Kaohsiung, Taiwan
- Spam Museum, Austin, Minnesota, US
- Spring Onion Culture Museum, Yilan County, Taiwan
- Strataca, Hutchinson, Kansas, US
- Sugar Museum (Berlin)
- Sugar Museum, Tienen, Belgium

=== T ===
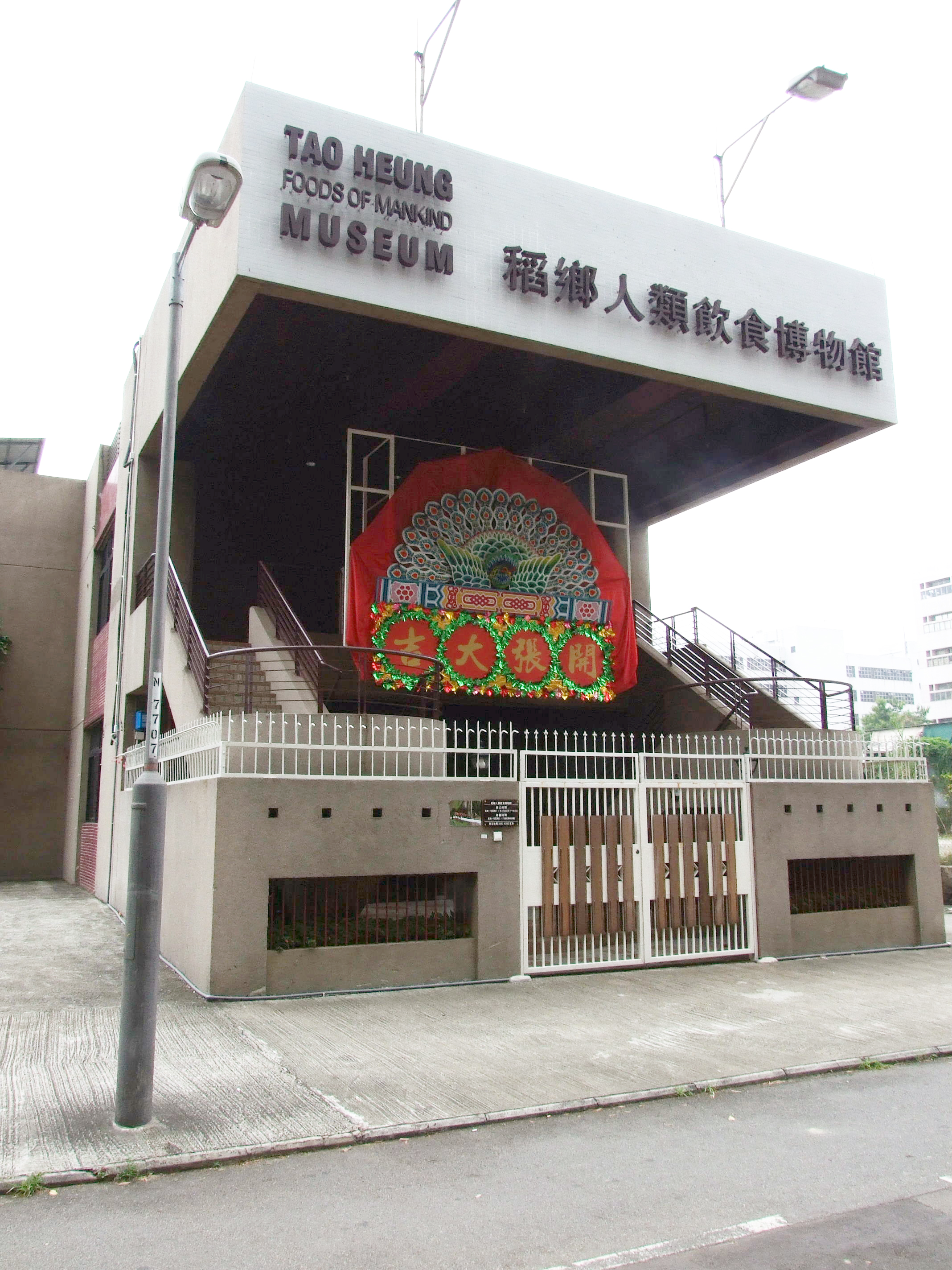
The front of the Tao Heung Foods of Mankind Museum

- Tabasco Museum, Avery Island, Louisiana, US
- Taipei Story House, Taipei, Taiwan
- Taiwan Mochi Museum, Nantou County, Taiwan
- Taiwan Nougat Museum, New Taipei, Taiwan
- Taiwan Salt Museum, Tainan, Taiwan
- Taiwan Sugar Museum (Kaohsiung), Kaohsiung, Taiwan
- Taiwan Sugar Museum (Tainan)
- Tao Heung Foods of Mankind Museum
- Tenfu Tea Museum
- Teng Feng Fish Ball Museum, New Taipei, Taiwan
- The Food Museum, Stowmarket, Suffolk, England
- The Hershey Story
- The Museum of the American Cocktail
- The Rum Story
- Theefabriek
- Tottori Nijisseiki Pear Museum
- Tteok & Kitchen Utensil Museum
- Tropical Fruit World
- Twinings Museum

=== U ===
- Universal Exposition of Wines and Spirits
- Universalmuseum Joanneum

=== V ===
- Vajdahunyad Castle
- Vino Versum Poysdorf
- Vinseum – Catalan Wine Cultures Museum
- Museum of the History of Russian Vodka, Moscow, Russia

=== W ===
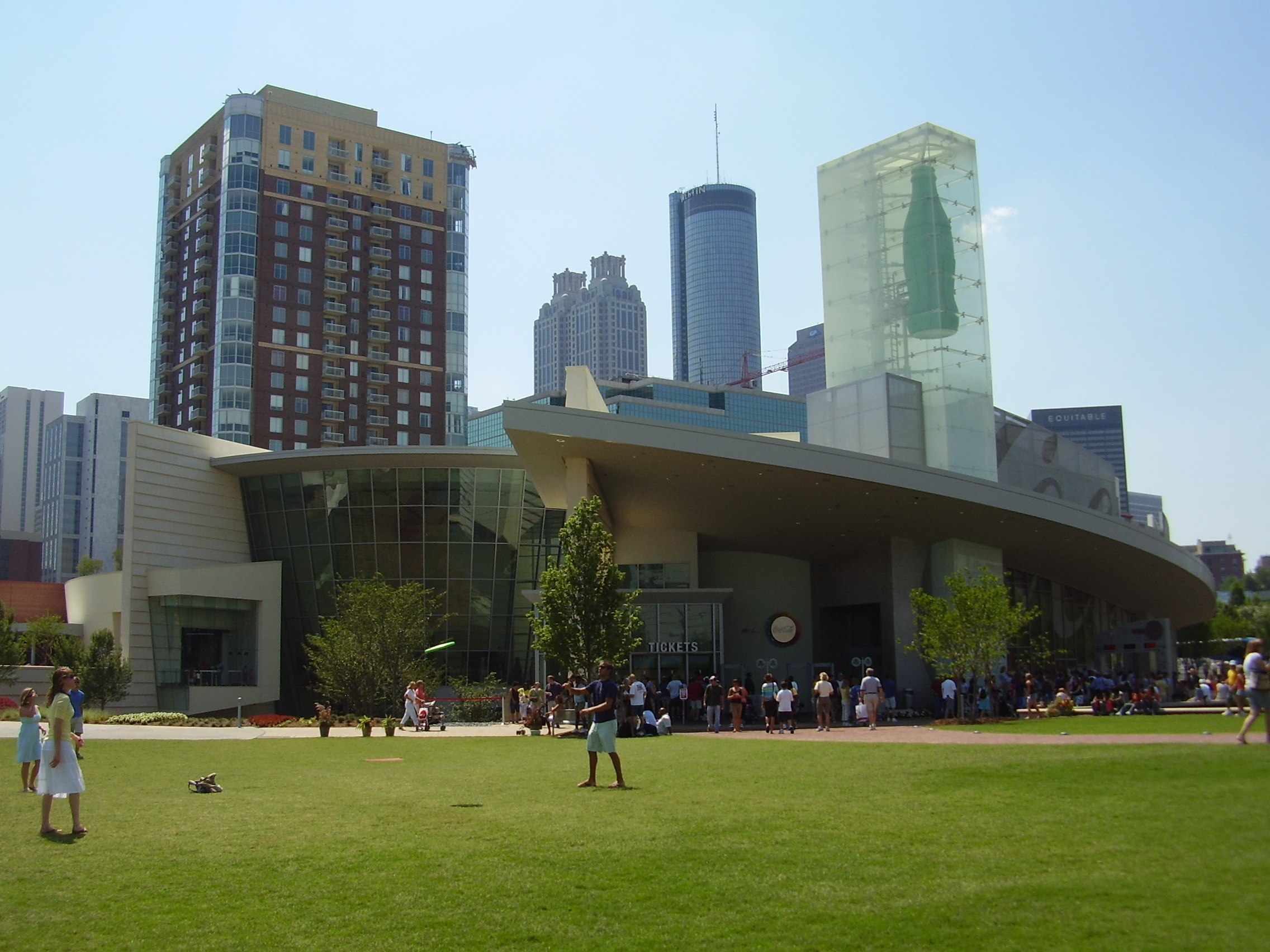
The exterior of the World of Coca-Cola

- Waffle House Museum, Decatur, Georgia
- Weaver Hall Museum and Workhouse, Northwich, Cheshire, England
- Wieliczka Salt Mine, Wieliczka, Poland
- Wine and Vine Museum (Naoussa)
- Wine Museum (Pleven)
- Wine Museum and Enoteca
- Witloofmuseum, Kampenhout, Belgium (obsolete)
- Wood Old Homestead
- World Carrot Museum online only
- World of Coca-Cola, Atlanta, Georgia, US
- Wu Tao Chishang Lunch Box Cultural History Museum
- Wyandot Popcorn Museum, Marion, Ohio, US

=== Y ===
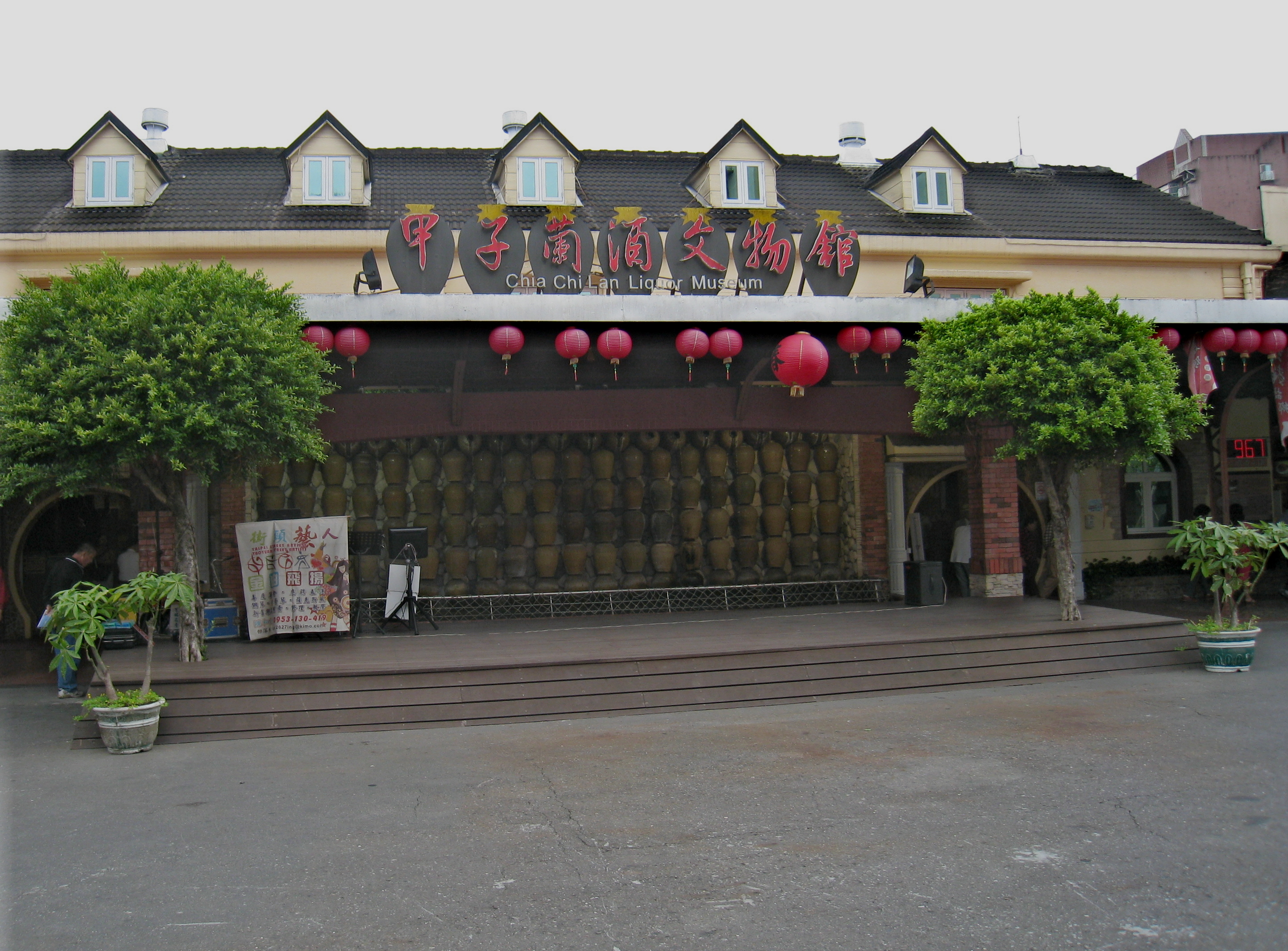
Yilan Distillery Chia Chi Lan Wine Museum in Taiwan

- Yilan Distillery Chia Chi Lan Wine Museum, Yilan County, Taiwan
- Yokohama Curry Museum

=== Z ===
- Zaans Museum
- Zigong Salt History Museum
- Zupy krakowskie

== See also ==
- Food history
- List of chocolate museums
- List of potato museums
- Wine Museum
