= Wine museum =

Wine Museum may refer to:

- Vino Versum Poysdorf, Austria
- Wine Museum (Pleven), Bulgaria
- Wine Museum, Ehnen, Luxembourg
- Wine Museum and Enoteca, Brazil
- Wine and Vine Museum (Naoussa), Naoussa, Greece
- Cyprus Wine Museum, Limassol District, Cyprus
- Macau Wine Museum, Macau, SAR China
- Musée du Vin (Wine Museum of Paris), France
- Museo del vino (Torgiano), Italy
- Drăgășani Wine Museum, Romania
- Yilan Distillery Chia Chi Lan Wine Museum, Taiwan
