= List of potato museums =

Museums dedicated to the potato can be found in North America and Europe.

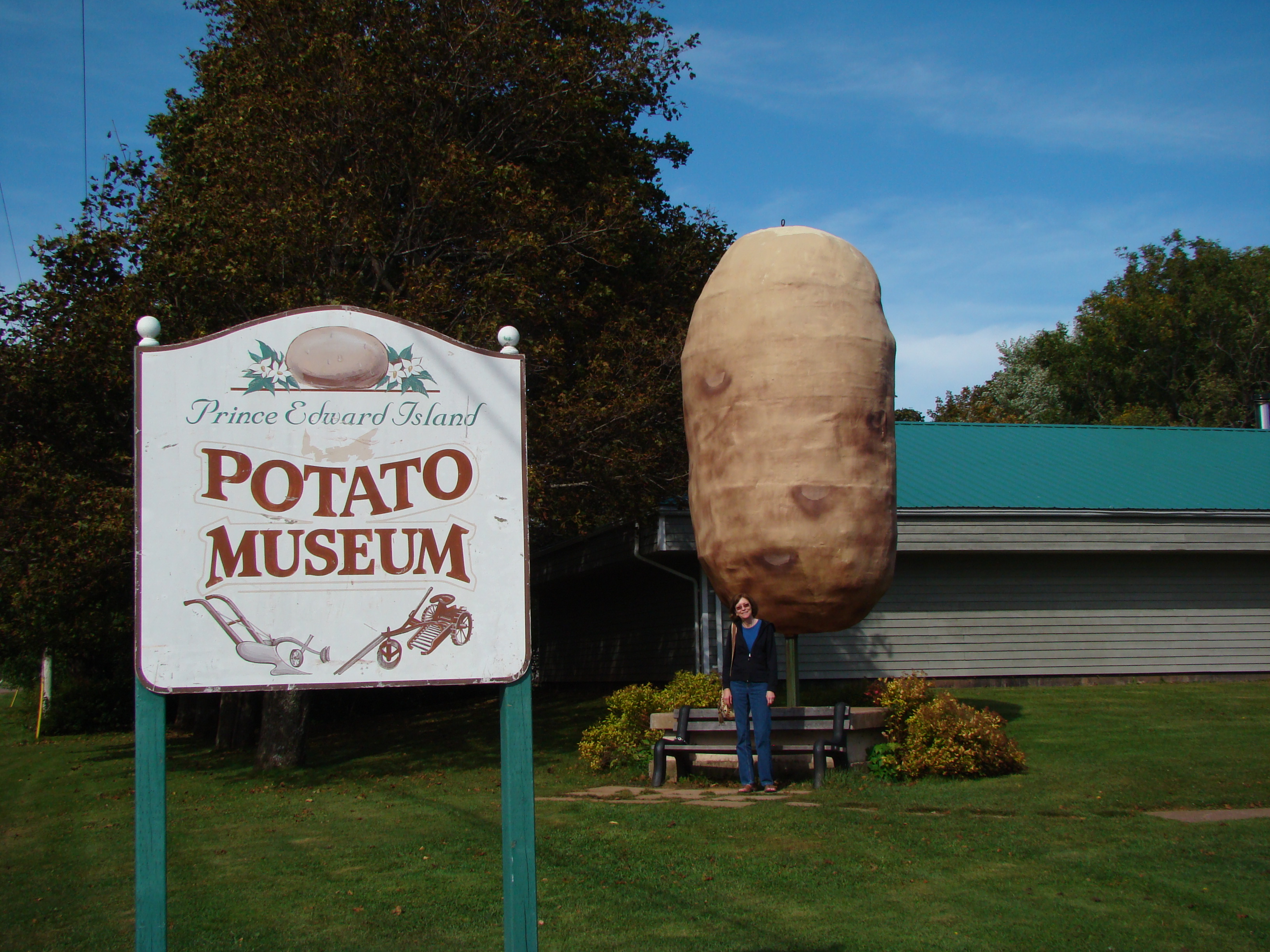
Prince Edward Island Potato Museum

== Austria ==
- Waldviertler Erdäpfelwelt (Waldviertler potato world) is a museum with interactive displays located in the town hall of Schweiggers displaying the history and uses of potatoes to the present day.

== Belgium ==
- Musée vivant de la pomme de terre ("Living Museum of the Potato") in Genappe is part of the Wallonia Botanical Gardens and also houses a collection of onions from northern Europe.
- Frietmuseum in Bruges is dedicated to chips (or fries in American-English) and is located in one of Bruges' oldest buildings, dated 1399.

== Canada ==
- The Canadian Potato Museum in O'Leary, Prince Edward Island, claims to contain the world's largest collection of potato artifacts. It is also home to a Potato Hall of Fame. A 14-foot (4.3 m) high giant potato made of fiberglass stands at the entrance and visitors can learn about the origins of the wild potato up to modern-day agricultural practices.
- Potato World is a museum dedicated to the potato. It is located in Florenceville-Bristol, New Brunswick, known as the french fry capital of the world.

== Denmark ==
- Danmarks Kartoffelmuseum ("Danish Potato Museum") in Otterup is part of the Hofmansgave estate. The Hofmansgaves were responsible for popularising the potato in Denmark where potatoes were known as "German lumps".

== France ==
- Moulin Gentrey in Harsault (fr) is a former starch mill dating from 1870 which contains a small potato museum as part of a historical tour of starch production for the textile industry.
- Parmentier station on the Paris Metro has a small exhibition on the history of potatoes and Antoine-Augustin Parmentier.

== Germany ==
- Deutsches Kartoffelmuseum ("German Potato Museum") in Fußgönheim (de) is housed in a former synagogue next to the Fußgönheim Agricultural Museum. The museum dates from 1987.
- Das Kartoffelmuseum ("The Potato Museum") in Munich dates from 1996 and is run by the Otto Eckart Foundation on behalf of Pfanni GmbH, a division of Unilever.
- Vorpommersches Kartoffelmuseum ("Potato Museum of Vorpommern") in Tribsees (de)

== Italy ==
- Museo della patata ("Potato Museum") in Budrio

== Lithuania ==
- There is a Bulvės muziejus ("Potato Museum") in Kudirkos Naumiestis, near the border with Kaliningrad.

== Poland ==
- The Poznańskie Muzeum Pyry ("Poznań Potato Museum") in Poznań details the history of the potato and how it arrived in Europe, and the tour includes a baked potato.

== United States ==
- Potato Museum in Albuquerque, New Mexico, was originally housed in the basement of E. Thomas and Meredith Hughes' home in Washington, D.C., before moving to Albuquerque in 1993. It began in 1975 and is a nonprofit organization.
- Idaho Potato Museum is in Blackfoot, Idaho, and among the exhibits has the world's largest potato chip (crisp in British-English), a Pringle measuring 25 inches (64 cm)
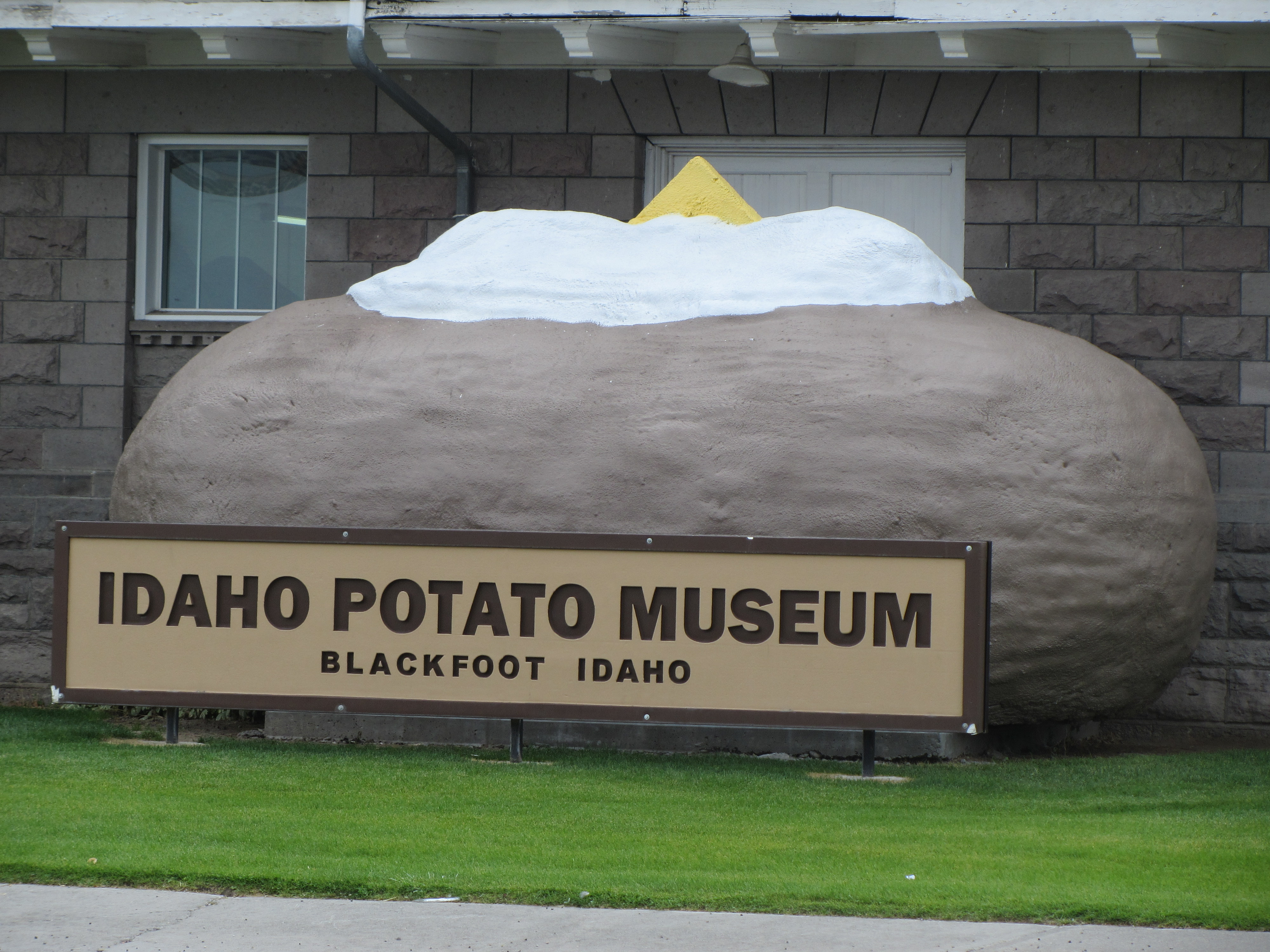
Idaho Potato Museum

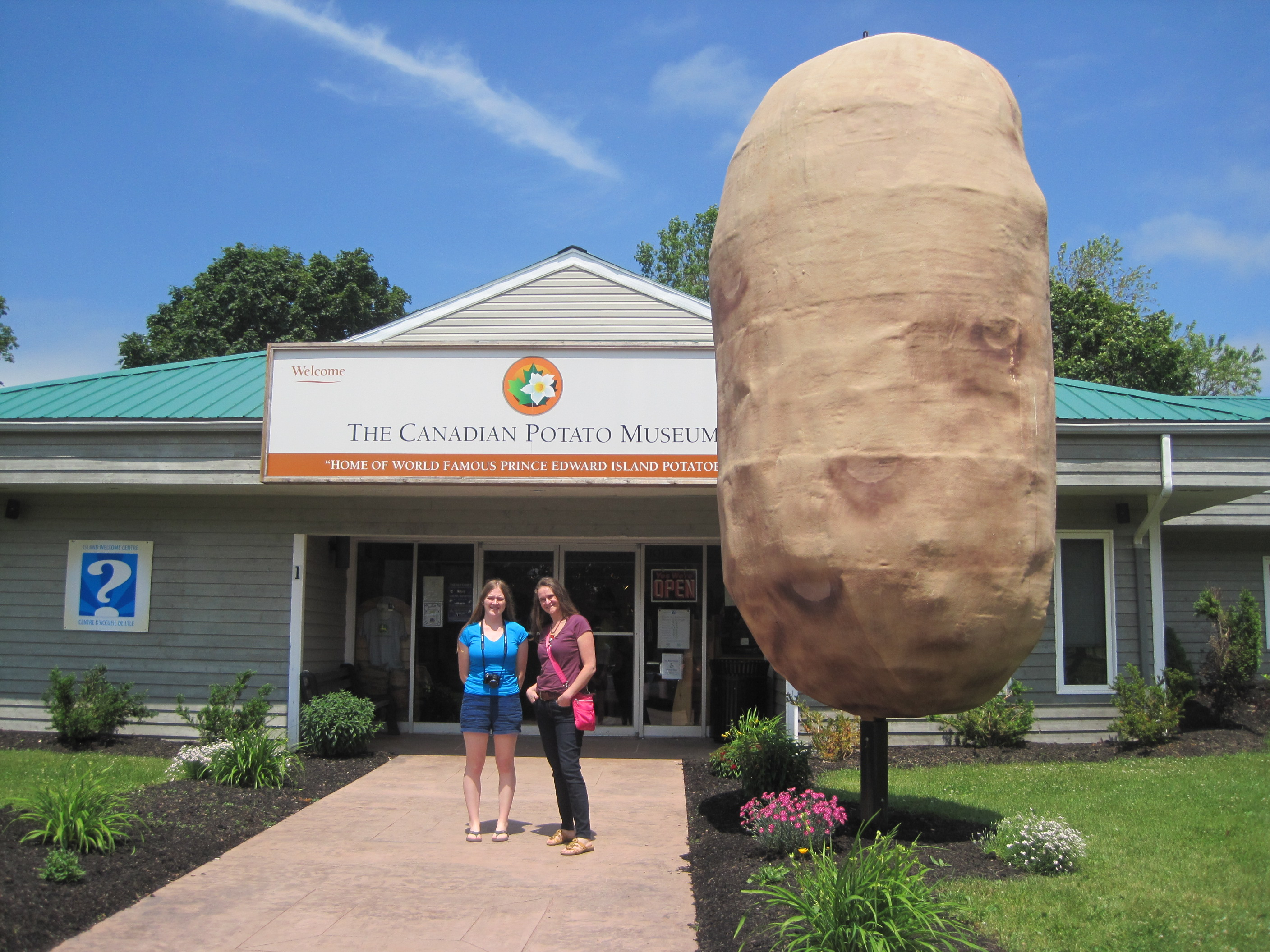
The Canadian Potato Museum, Prince Edward Island

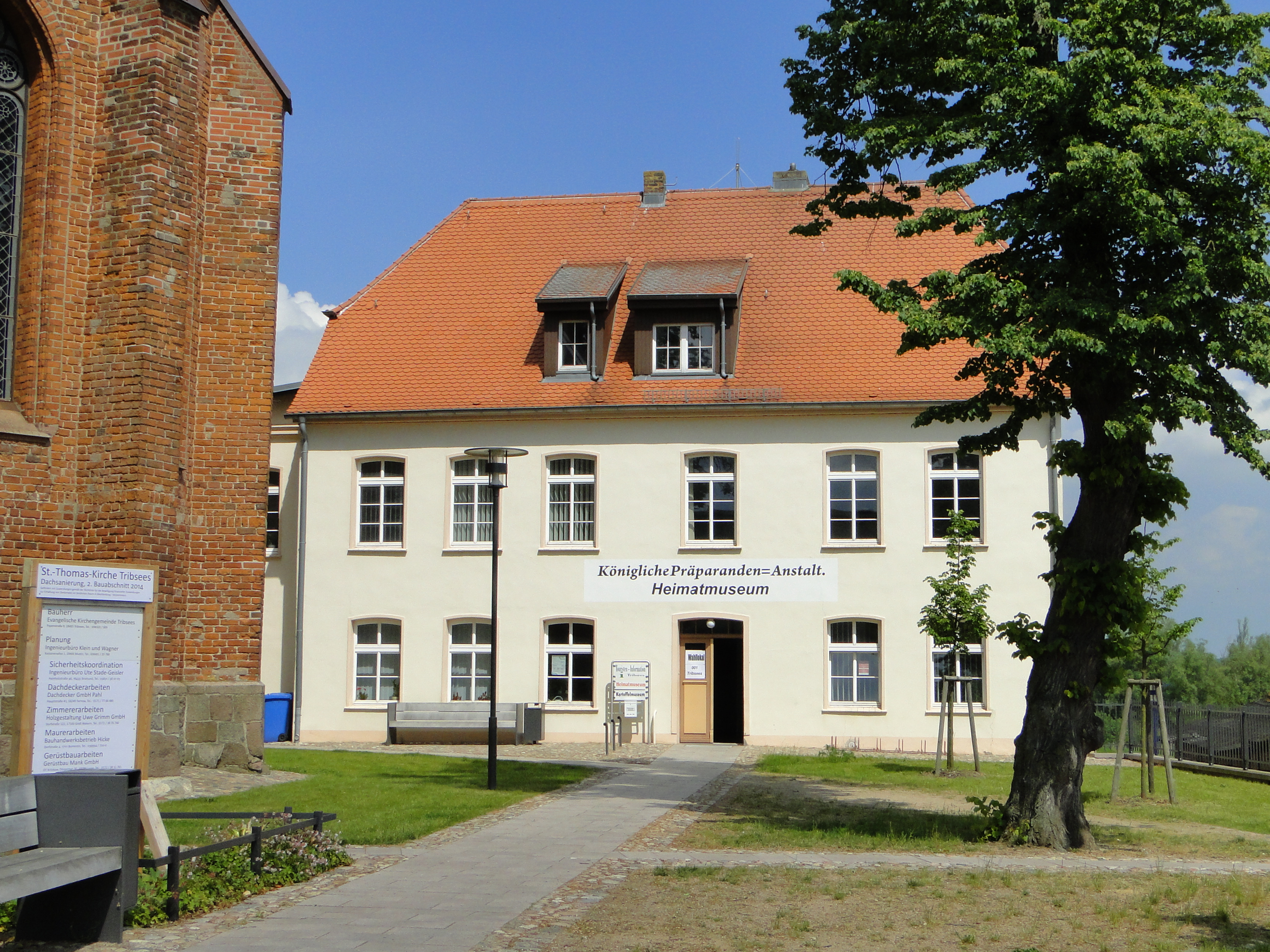
Vorpommersches Kartoffelmuseum, Tribsees, Germany

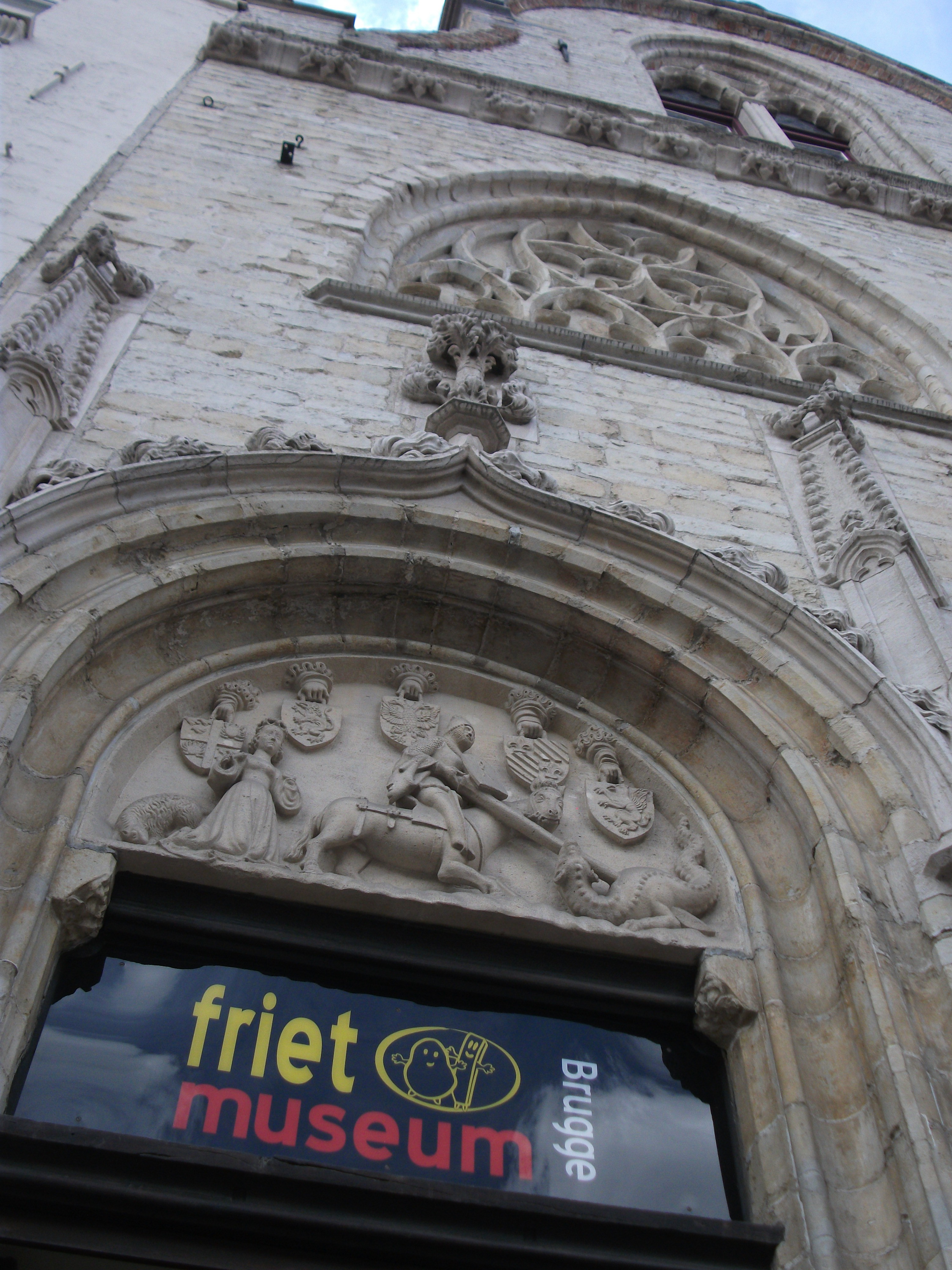
Frietmuseum (Fries Museum), Bruges, Belgium

== See also ==
- List of food and beverage museums
- Spring Onion Culture Museum
- World Carrot Museum
