= Kartoffelmuseum =

Museum in Munich, Germany

Coordinates: 48.1256°N 11.6058°E

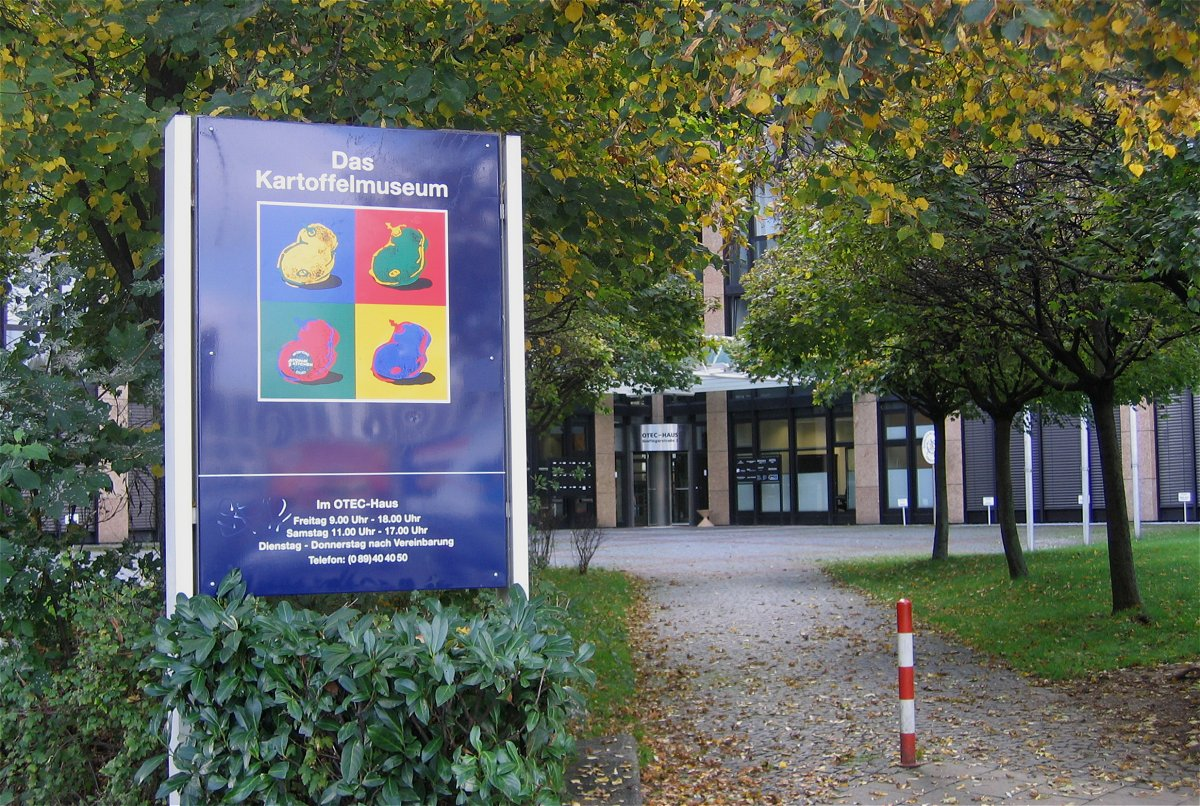
Former location of the potato museum in Grafinger Straße

Das Kartoffelmuseum (The Potato Museum) is one of many museums devoted to this staple food. It was concentrated on the art historical aspects of the potato. It was located in Munich, Germany, but closed in 2016.

== Founding ==
It was opened in 1996 by the Otto Eckart Foundation. Otto Eckart, son of the company founder Werner Eckart, owned the Pfanni food manufacturer until its sale to Unilever. In addition to his work as a member of the board of trustees, he served as the Honorary Consul of the Republic of Guatemala.

== Scope ==
The museum is based on a comprehensive collection of paintings (oil paintings, watercolors, engravings, drawings, lithographs, prints, naive glass paintings, modern graphics). In addition to the exhibition, the museum also includes a specialist library for scientific research.

The museum had eight exhibition rooms:

- History: From Inca gold to folk food
- Flowers, plants, tubers
- Cultivation and harvesting
- Market scenes
- Multi-talent potato
- Rare collection
- Fattening food and poor people eating
- Gallery of Modern Art

In 2006, the museum added a new department depicting the history of the Pfanni trademark from 1949 to 1999.

== Closure ==
Until March 2016, the museum was located in the so-called "Eckhaus" on the former premises of Pfanni factory on Grafinger Strasse, where the company produced potato products. The museum began to prepare for its move that month. As of November 2018, the museum website states is it temporarily closed and gives no information regarding reopening.
