= Deutsches Brauereimuseum =

Coordinates: 48°08′06.36″N 11°34′22.98″E

The Deutsche Brauereimuseum ("German brewery museum") at the St.-Jakobs-Platz in Munich was founded in 1952 on the initiative of the Bavarian Hofbräuhaus.

It is the most famous museum of its kind in Germany and is part of the local city museum (Munich Stadtmuseum). The museum is sponsored by a voluntary museum's association. Focal point of the collection is the historical and technical evolution of beer brewing. The oldest exhibit is a drinking vessel of the 4th millennium BC. In addition to beer glassware and beer jugs there are models of big breweries and a complete microbrewery.

== See also ==
- List of food and beverage museums
