= Food Museum, Thanjavur =

Museum in Tamil Nadu, India

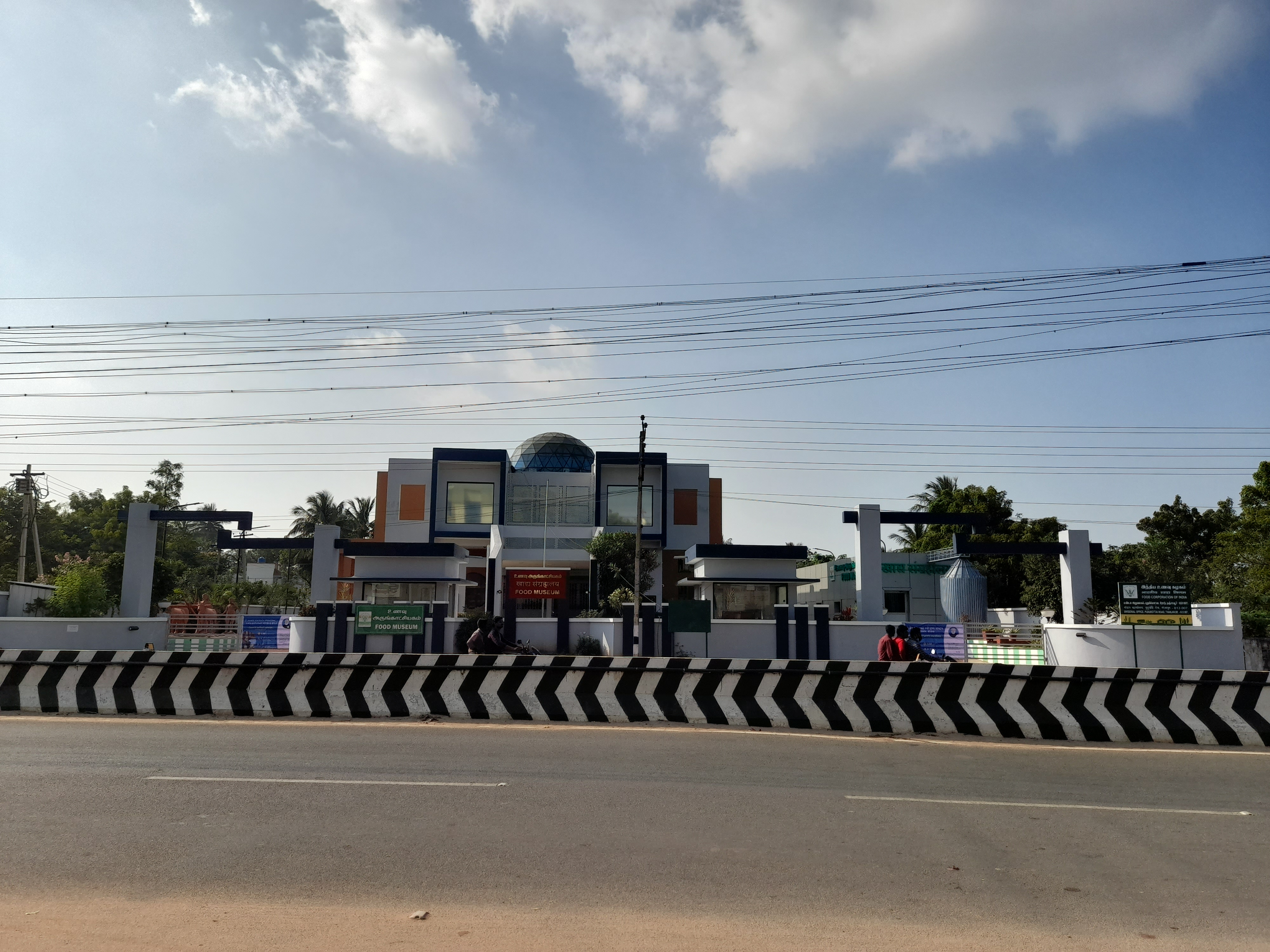
- External view of the food museum
- Established: 2021; 5 years ago
- Location: Thanjavur, Tamil Nadu, India
- Type: Agriculture, Food
- Owners: Food Corporation of India, Government of India
- Website: Official site

The Food Museum, Thanjavur is the first food museum located in India. This museum is located in the Thanjavur district of Tamil Nadu, India. It is affiliated with the Food Corporation of India (FCI).

== History ==
The first Food Corporation of India (FCI) office in India was started in Thanjavur in 1965. Subsequently, these offices were expanded across the entire country. Following this, various institutions related to food development were established by the Government of India. Furthermore, it was decided to establish the first museum of the Food Corporation of India in Thanjavur. The foundation stone was laid by the then concerned Minister, Ram Vilas Paswan, in May 2015.

Upon the completion of these works, the museum was inaugurated virtually by the Union Minister of Commerce and Industry, Piyush Goyal, on November 15, 2021.

== Exhibits ==
This museum is based on the theme of Food. It shares the history of how food was collected from the Mesolithic period, covering various storage methods and the challenges faced by early humans.

The museum's exhibits primarily include key information regarding the history, procurement, storage and protection, and distribution of the Food Corporation of India (FCI).

A 3D film and a virtual film about the Food Corporation of India, along with a quiz facility for children, are available to attract visitors.
