= National Mustard Museum =

Museum in Middleton, Wisconsin, U.S.

- The museum in 2019
- Former name: Mount Horeb Mustard Museum
- Established: April 6, 1992 (original location); November 2009 (new location)
- Location: Middleton, Wisconsin
- Coordinates: 43.095372°N 89.511093°W
- Type: Food museum
- Accreditation: April 5, 1992.
- Collection size: 7,000+ items
- Founder: Barry Levenson
- Website: mustardmuseum.org mustardmuseum.com

The National Mustard Museum (formerly the Mount Horeb Mustard Museum) is a museum in Middleton, Wisconsin. It boasts a large display of prepared mustards. It is often featured in lists of unusual museums in the United States.

The museum was conceived and founded by Barry Levenson, former Assistant Attorney General of Wisconsin. It centers on a mustard collection he began in 1986 while despondent over the failure of his favorite baseball team, the Boston Red Sox, to win the 1986 World Series. The initial dozen jars have grown to a collection of more than 5,600 mustards from more than 60 countries, along with hundreds of items of mustard memorabilia and exhibits depicting the use of mustard through history.

A display at the museum

The museum opened its doors in Mount Horeb, Wisconsin, on April 6, 1992. It moved across the street to a larger site in October 2000. In November 2009, the museum moved to Middleton and changed its name to the present one.

Admission is free of charge, and the museum is open between 10 a.m. and 5 p.m., though it is closed on Easter, Thanksgiving, Christmas, and New Year's Day.

The museum's gift shop occupies about half of its floor space and offers free tasting of mustard samples from a refrigerated case containing scores of varieties; the museum also operates a mail-order mustard business.

Among the displays are sweet hot mustards, fruit mustards, hot pepper mustards, horseradish mustards, and spirit mustards. The collection includes a large variety of French and English mixes, but many other countries are also represented.

In 2002, the museum was showcased on the Food Network television series Unwrapped. The museum and its curator have also been featured on National Public Radio's Morning Edition broadcast of July 29, 2010, Weekend Edition Saturday on February 18, 1995 (when it was located in Mount Horeb), and CBS News Sunday Morning on July 6, 2025.
