= McDonald's No. 1 Store Museum =

Early McDonald's restaurant location

McDonald's #1 Store Museum
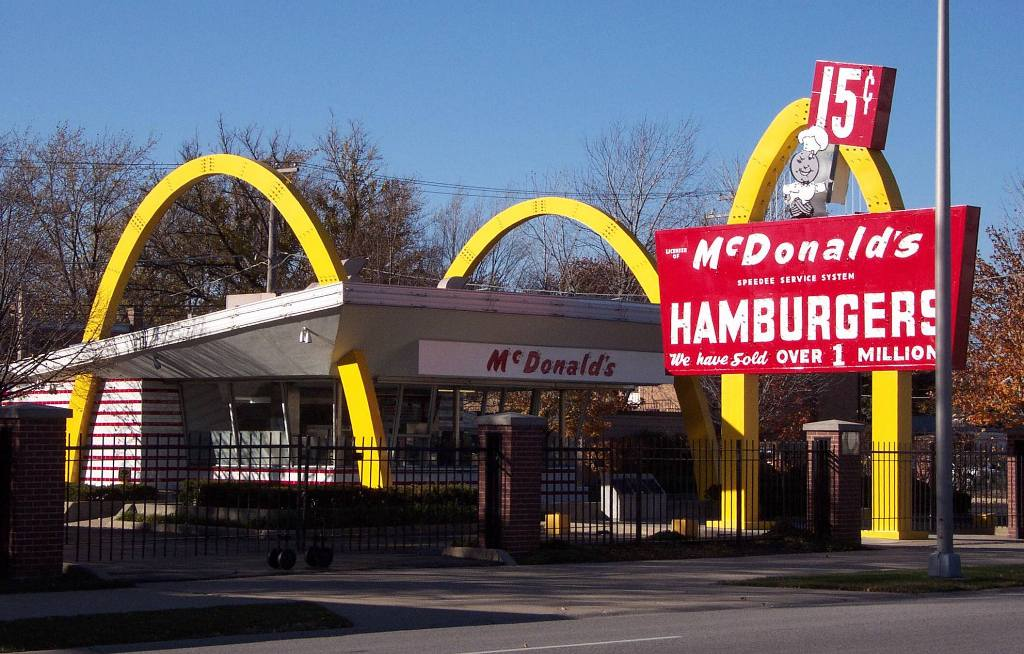
- Established: April 15, 1955
- Dissolved: 2018
- Location: 400 N. Lee Street, Des Plaines, Illinois
- Coordinates: 42°02′46″N 87°53′10″W

The McDonald's #1 Store Museum was housed in a replica of the former McDonald's restaurant in Des Plaines, Illinois, US, opened by Ray Kroc in April 1955. The company usually refers to this as the original McDonald's, although it was actually the ninth McDonald's restaurant.

== Actual first restaurant (1955-1984) ==
The first McDonald's location was opened by Richard and Maurice McDonald in San Bernardino, California, in 1940 and demolished in 1972, although part of the sign remains. The oldest McDonald's still in operation is the third one built, in Downey, California, which opened in 1953.

However, the Des Plaines restaurant marked the beginning of future CEO Kroc's involvement with the firm. It opened under the aegis of his franchising company McDonald's Systems, Inc., which became McDonald's Corporation after Kroc purchased the McDonald brothers' stake in the firm. Kroc's restaurant was the first McDonald's built in a colder climate, and some adaptations were made to the design, including a basement with a furnace.

It was built in 1955 and demolished in 1984.

== Replica (1985-2018) ==
McDonald's realized that the Des Plaines restaurant had historical significance, so it built a replica. With gold arches placed over a glass and metal, red-and-white tiled exterior, the building largely followed the McDonald brothers' original blueprints, which they had introduced when they began franchising in 1953.

McDonald's announced in 2017 that the building would be torn down due to repeated flooding of the site. Despite attempts to save the building, demolition was completed in 2018. McDonald's then decided to donate the land to the city for a grassy park area.

=== Architecture ===
The entrance sign was original, with early cartoon mascot "Speedee", representing the innovative Speedee Service System, inspired by assembly-line production which the McDonald brothers had introduced in 1948. It was, however, moved from its original location at the south end of the property. The sign boasted "We have sold over 1 million." The replica museum offered irregular summer hours and was often closed; tours were by appointment. The ground floor exhibited original fry vats, milkshake Multimixers which Kroc had been selling when he first encountered the San Bernardino McDonald's restaurant, soda barrels, and grills, all attended to by a crew of male mannequins in 1950s uniforms. Visitors could walk in through the kitchen or look through the order windows in front. There was no sit-down restaurant section in the 1955 design. In the basement was a collection of vintage ads, photos, and a video about McDonald's history. Upon demolition, various equipment was relocated to McDonald's corporate headquarters in downtown Chicago as well as its R&D facility in the southwest Chicago suburbs.

== McDonald's history at Des Plaines McDonald's (1980s-present) ==
In the 1980s, a new McDonald's was built across the street and to the south, replacing a Ground Round. At this McDonald's, there are a half dozen glass-enclosed exhibits featuring McDonald's historical artifacts arrayed around the eating tables. Included are red and white tiles from the original restaurant and string ties worn by employees from the 1950s to the early 1970s. A blueprint for the original "Speedee" electrical sign appears on one wall.

== Other McDonald's museums ==
The Big Mac Museum Restaurant, another McDonald's museum, opened on August 23, 2007, in Irwin, Pennsylvania, on Route 30 Lincoln Hwy.

A museum also exists at the Original McDonald's site in San Bernardino on U.S. Route 66 in California. It is a reconstruction operated by the owner of the Juan Pollo chain and is not affiliated with McDonald's Corporation.

== See also ==
- List of food and beverage museums
- Oldest McDonald's restaurant
