= Yokohama Curry Museum =

Museum in Yokohama, Japan about Japanese curry

Coordinates: 35.444869°N 139.633776°E

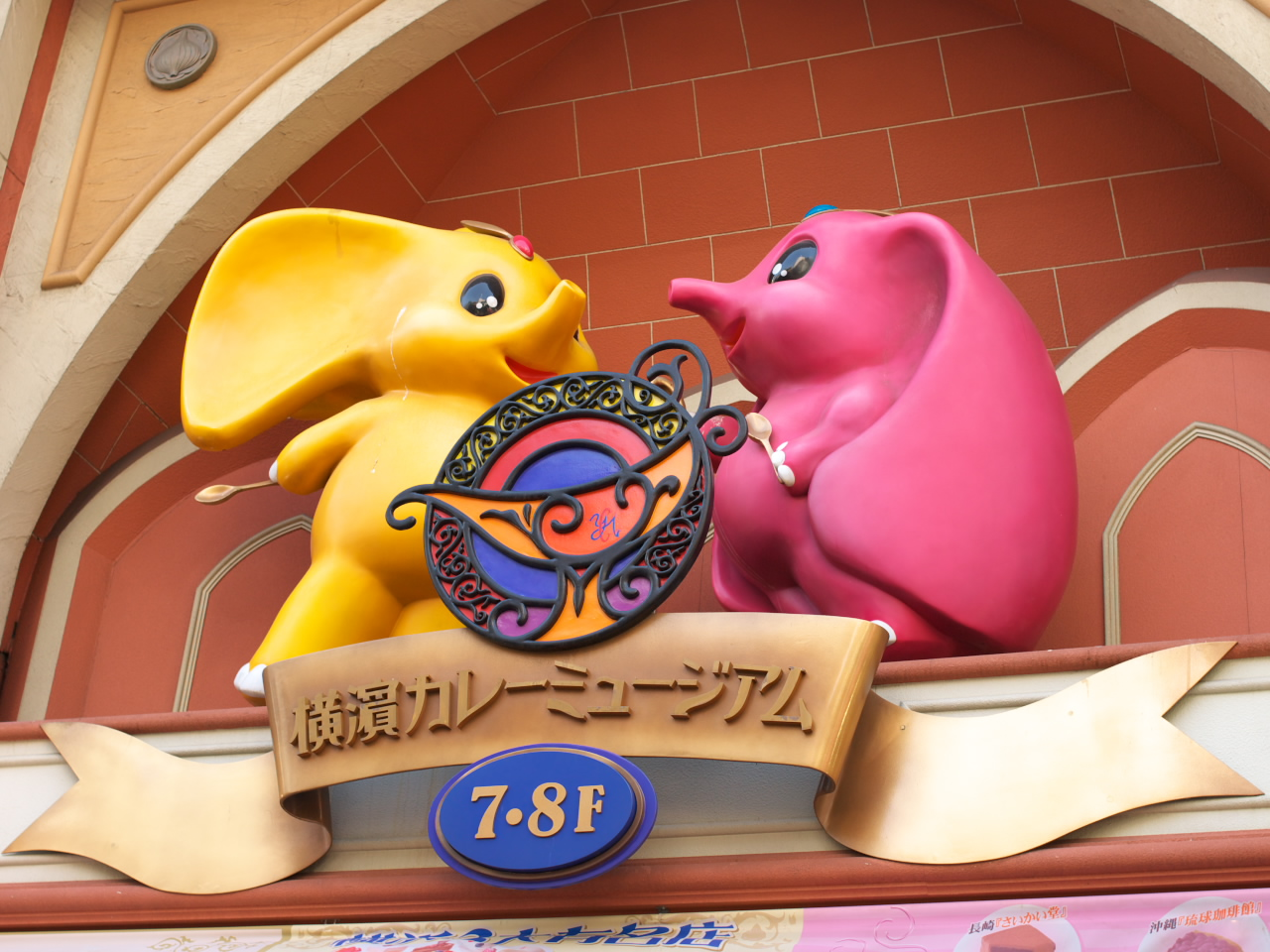
Entrance to museum, March 2007

The Yokohama Curry Museum (横濱カレーミュージアム, Yokohama Karē Myūjiamu) was a restaurant and historic museum of curry in the Isezakichō district of the port city of Yokohama, Japan, between 2001 and 2007. Different types of curry were available from a selection or restaurants, ranging from a full meal to a quick taste option.

The museum included a recreation of Yokohama's port in the late 19th century. Exhibits lined the walls and part of the central area built in the form of a ship at port. On the eighth floor there was a recreated cabin with Morse code radio instruments.

Operated by Matahari Co., Ltd., the museum opened on 26 January 2001, and closed on 31 March 2007. By the end of November 2006, a total of 8.7 million visitors had visited the museum.

== See also ==
- List of food and beverage museums
