= Centro Cultural la Azotea =

Museum complex in Jocotenango, Guatemala

- Location within Guatemala Location within Central America
- Coordinates: 14°34′28″N 90°44′43″W

The Centro Cultural la Azotea ("La Azotea" Cultural Center) is a cultural center and museum complex, located in the township and municipality of Jocotenango in Guatemala's Sacatepéquez Department. It lies some 2 kilometres (1.2 mi) north of the department's capital Antigua Guatemala in the city's modern outskirts, and is approximately 43 kilometres (27 mi) from the national capital, Guatemala City.

The center comprises three separate museums, on the grounds of a coffee-growing estate or finca. The center contains a coffee museum, which illustrates the history of processing and marketing Coffee production in Guatemala, the Mayan Music Museum, also known as Casa K'ojom which houses Mayan musical instruments from pre-Columbian times, and the Rincon de Sacatepéquez Museum which has items related to traditional Guatemalan dress. The center also offers horse riding facilities and tours of the small coffee estate.

== See also ==
- List of food and beverage museums
