= SAB World of Beer =

South African museum of beer and conference venue

Coordinates: 26°12′16″S 28°02′01″E

SAB World of Beer was a museum of beer, and conference venue operated by South African Breweries; it was located in Newtown, Johannesburg, South Africa.

It closed in September 2019.
