= Wine Museum (Pleven) =

Museum in Pleven, Bulgaria

- Музей на виното Muzey na vinoto
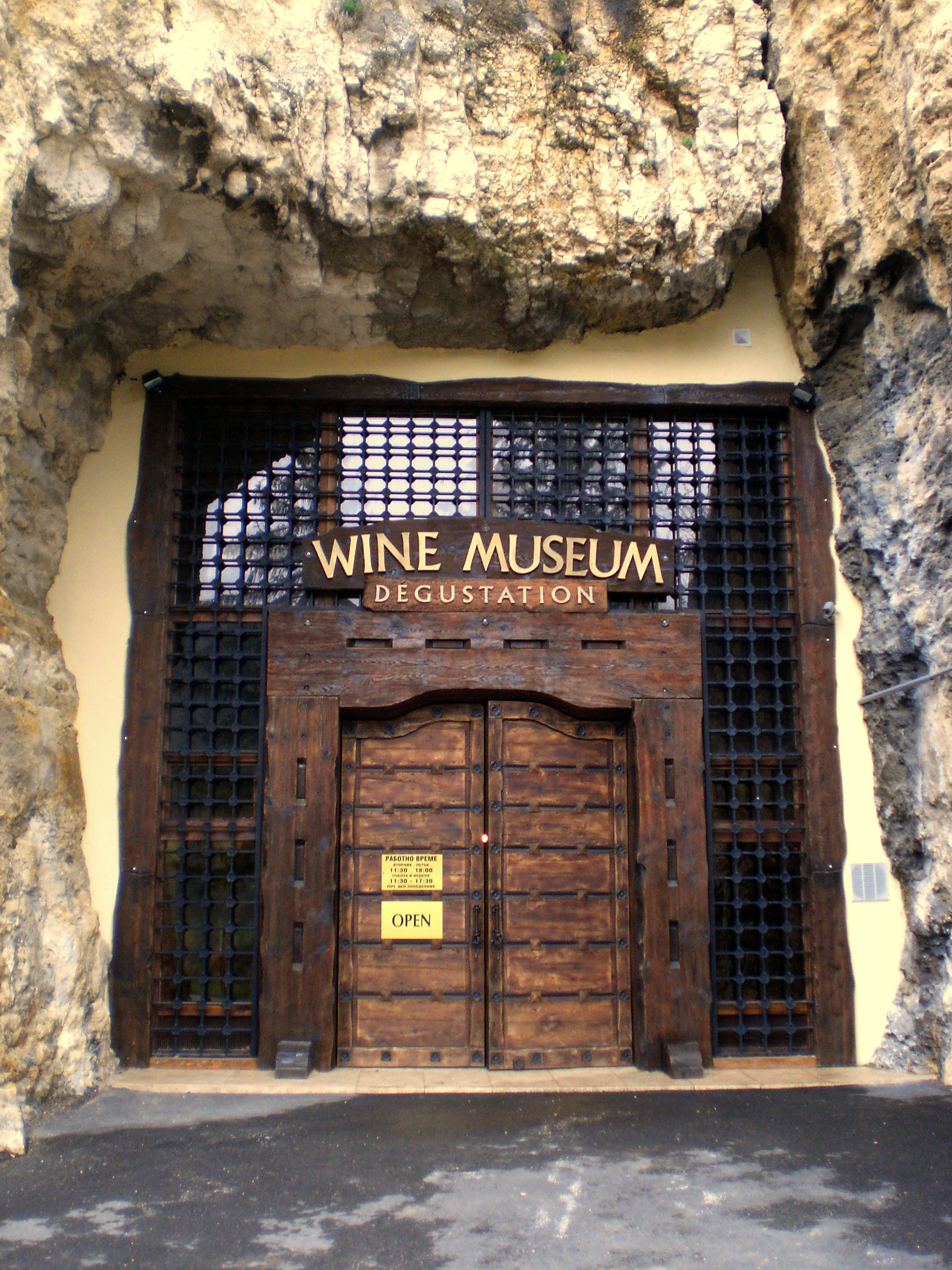
- Entrance to the Wine Museum

- Location within Bulgaria
- Established: 2008
- Location: Pleven, Bulgaria
- Coordinates: 43°21′25.7″N 24°38′7.01″E

The Wine Museum (Bulgarian: Музей на виното, Muzey na vinoto) is a museum of wine and viticulture located in Pleven, a city in north central Bulgaria. Opened on 17 September 2008, the museum occupies a natural cave in Pleven's Kaylaka park, about 5 kilometres (3.1 mi) from the city centre.

The museum was the result of a collaboration between Bulgarian and French architects, designers and oenologists, as well as curators from the Pleven Panorama and the Pleven Regional Historical Museum. The museum is near the Totleben's Rampart Reservoir, and has five galleries and a total area of 650 square metres (7,000 sq ft).

The Wine Museum's collection includes over 6,000 bottles of Bulgarian wine from all viticultural regions of the country, which are available for tasting and purchase. In addition, the museum boasts the country's largest collection of over 7,000 old wines (ranging from 30 to 90 years in age). The museum's historical hall exhibits items related to vine growing and wine making in the Bulgarian lands from ancient Thracian times until today. The wine cellar offers wines from all Bulgarian regions stored in 100 wine barrels made of French oak. The museum's wine collection is owned by Plamen Petkov, a major local vineyard owner, who has invested over $300,000 in temperature control systems, flooring and lighting for the cave which houses the museum.

Pleven is located in the heart of a major vine-growing region, the Danubian Plain. The city is also a centre of wine-related education, as it is the home of Bulgaria's first and only specialized high school, the Aleksandar Stamboliyski Professional High School of Vine Growing and Wine Making, established in 1890. The National Institute of Viticulture and Oenology, founded in 1902 at the recommendation of French wine specialist Pierre Viala, is also located in Pleven.

== See also ==
- List of food and beverage museums
