= Yilan Distillery Chia Chi Lan Liquor Museum =

Museum in Yilan City, Yilan County, Taiwan

- 宜蘭酒廠甲子蘭酒文物館
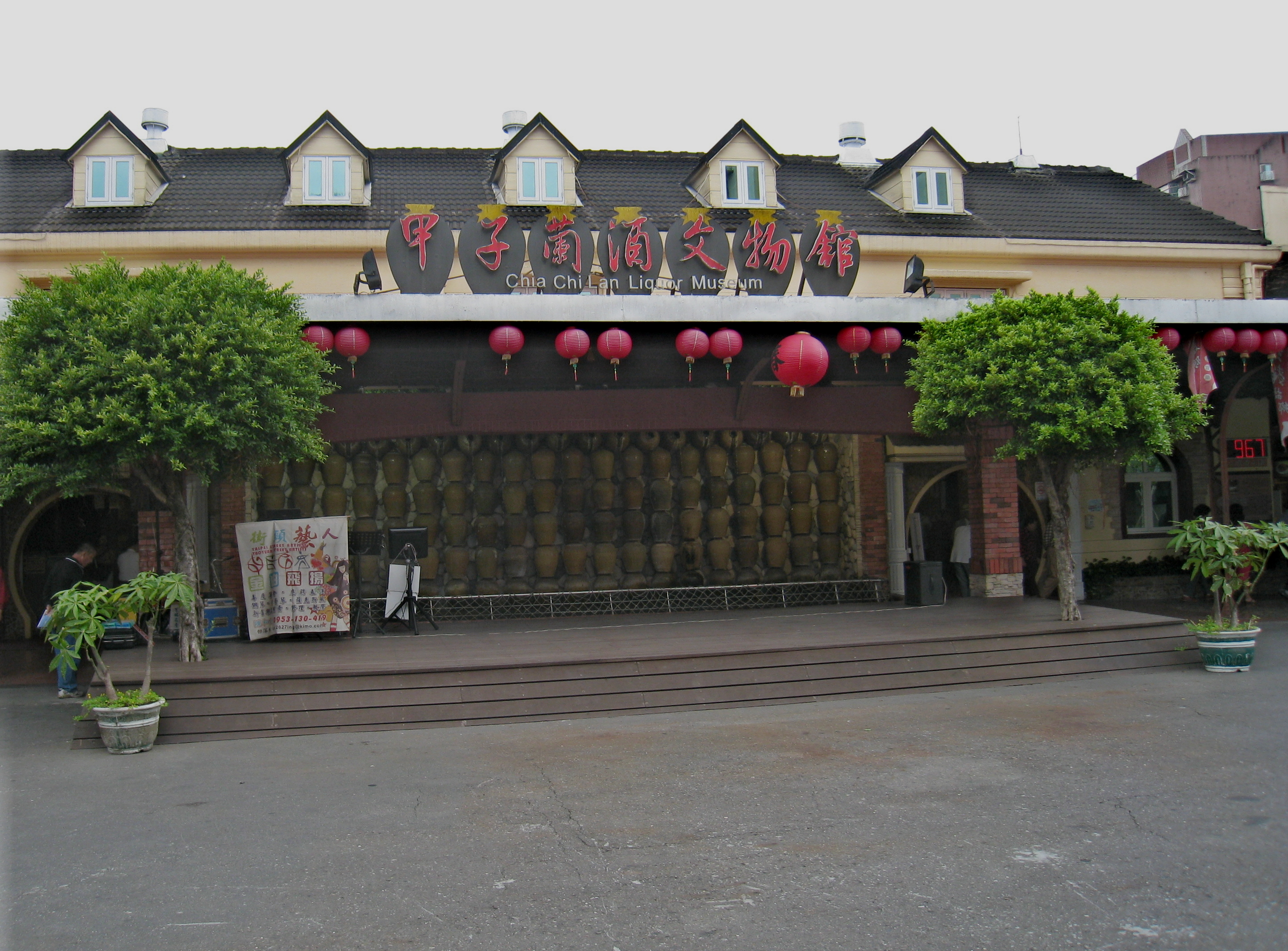
- Established: 1998
- Location: Yilan City, Yilan County, Taiwan
- Coordinates: 24°45′24″N 121°45′03″E
- Type: museum
- Owner: Yilan Distillery

The Yilan Distillery Chia Chi Lan Liquor Museum (traditional Chinese: 宜蘭酒廠甲子蘭酒文物館; simplified Chinese: 宜兰酒厂甲子兰酒文物馆; pinyin: Yílán Jiǔ Chǎng Jiǎzǐlán Jiǔ Wénwùguǎn) or Chia Chi Lan Liquor Museum is a museum about wine in Yilan City, Yilan County, Taiwan.

== History ==
The museum building was originally built in 1935.

== Architecture ==
The museum building is a two-story house in Japanese style.

== Exhibition ==
The museum houses the display of wine cultures, such as wine manufacturing process and the chronicle for both Taiwan Tobacco and Liquor Monopoly Bureau and Yilan Distillery throughout history.

== Transportation ==
The museum is accessible within walking distance west from Yilan Station of Taiwan Railway.

== See also ==
- List of museums in Taiwan
- Wine Museum
