= Wine and Vine Museum (Naoussa) =

Museum in Naoussa, Greece

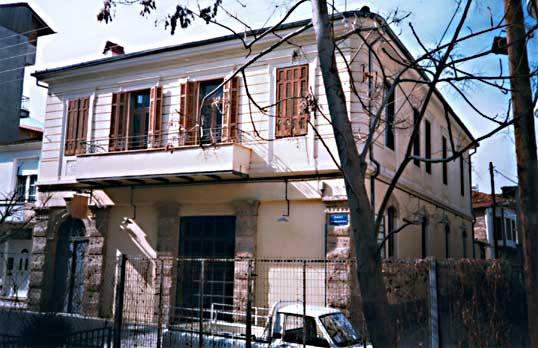
Museum, external view

The Wine and Vine Museum is a new museum housed in the traditional building belonging to Ioannis Boutaris in the centre of Naoussa in Central Macedonia, Greece. The museum’s mission is primarily educational, in other words to make known the history of wine and wine-making in Naoussa and the surrounding district. All exhibits were donated by the wine-makers and inhabitants of the region.

It also houses the BIBON - Bibliotecha Oenologica, Greece’s first Bibliotecha Oenologica. A wine library by the Boutaris Foundation, in collaboration with the Public Central Library of Veria and the non-profit civil partnership Future Library.

On display in the museum is the Boutari family’s old wine fermentation vat, wine barrels, demijohns, raki vats, baskets (panniers) for the grape harvest, and other agricultural tools for vine growers. Furthermore, the vineyards and wines of Naoussa are presented through the programme entitled ‘The Roads of Wine’ and there are samples of wines made by all the wine-makers.

For young visitors there is an educational game on the subject of wine-making.

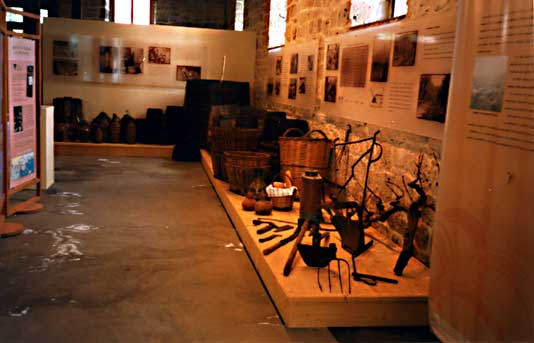
Internal view

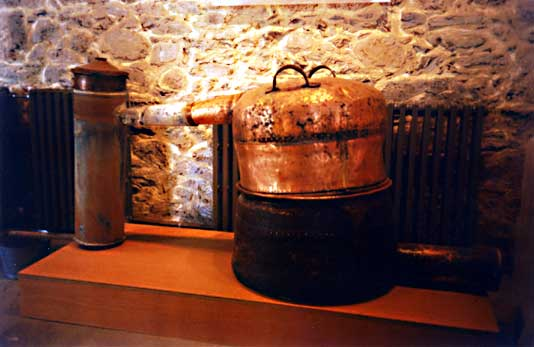
Distillation cauldrons

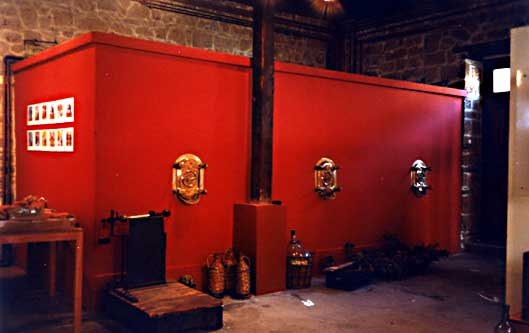
Wine reservoirs

== See also ==
- List of food and beverage museums
- List of libraries in Greece
- Yiannis Boutaris
- Greek wine

== Sources ==
- This article incorporates text from the corresponding article at the Museums of Macedonia website, commissioned by the Macedonian Heritage foundation, written by Vlasis Vlasidis, and published under a CC-BY-SA-3.0 license.
