= Frietmuseum =

Friet Museum
- Frietmuseum
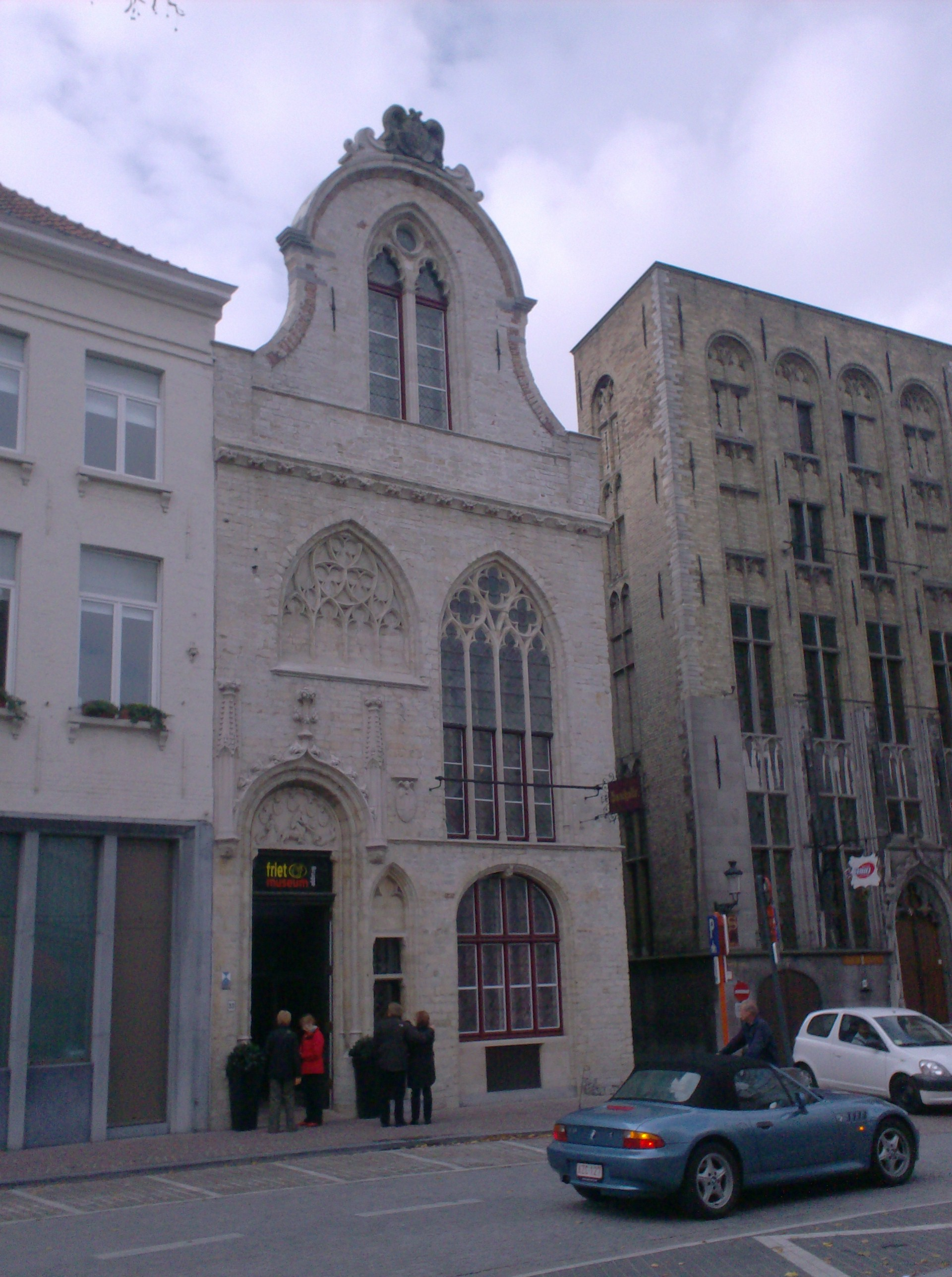
- The Gothic Saaihalle which houses the museum.
- Established: 2008
- Location: Bruges, Belgium
- Coordinates: 51°12′40″N 3°13′26″E
- Type: Food museum
- Owner: Eddy Van Belle
- Website: frietmuseum.be

The Frietmuseum (Fries museum) is a museum in Bruges, Belgium, which is devoted to the history of potatoes and the production of Belgian fries. It describes itself as "the first and only museum dedicated to potato fries".

== History ==
The museum was founded in 2008 by Eddy Van Belle, who had previously opened two other museums in Bruges, both based in one building: Choco-Story, which is dedicated to Belgium's chocolate industry, and Lumina Domestica, which houses Van Belle's 6,500-piece collection of lamps. Inspired by the popularity of Choco-Story, Van Belle had researched the possibility of a museum dedicated to fries, and was encouraged to open the Frietmuseum after discovering that no similar museum existed elsewhere.

== Description ==
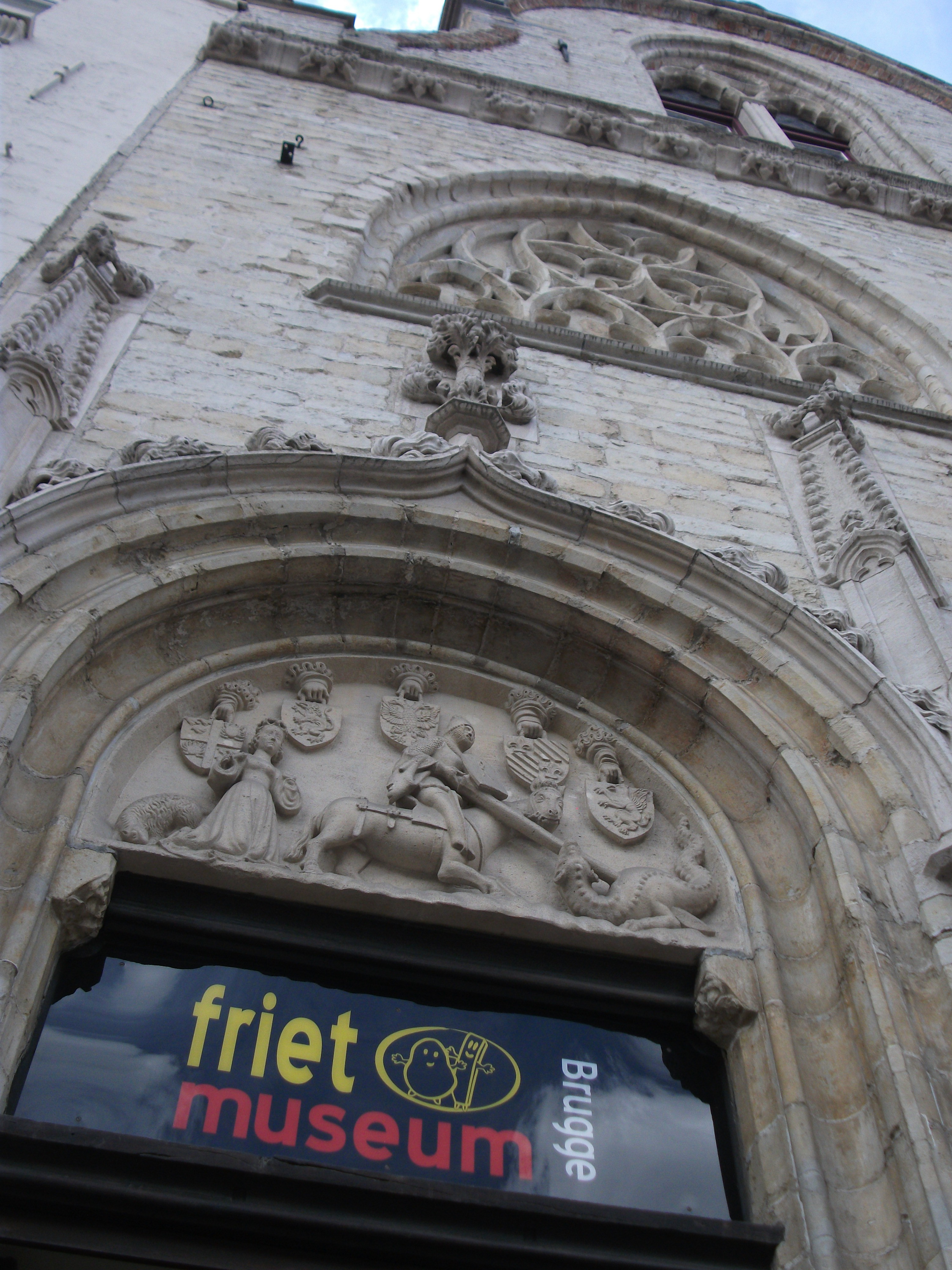
The entrance to the museum

The Frietmuseum is located in the Gothic Saaihalle (former wool hall) at Vlamingstraat 33. This is one of the oldest buildings in the World Heritage listed historic centre of Bruges and dates back to 1399, with an annexe added shortly afterwards. Throughout the fifteenth century, this building was used as a base for the activities of Genoese merchants. Prior to the museum's opening, it underwent a year and a half of renovation work, including restoration of the façade. During this work, no structural changes were made to the interior of the building.

The museum is spread across three floors. Exhibits on the ground floor trace the history of potatoes, beginning in Peru c.8000BC. The first floor details the history of fries, and their origins in Belgium. The basement of the building houses a cafe. Exhibits include photographs, artwork, historical potato peelers and chip-making machines, and a video outlining how to make perfect fries.

== Building ==
The building is housed in the Gothic Saaihalle (former wool hall). The building dates back to 1399, was extended as the residence of the Consul of Genoa in 1441, used by weavers from 1578 to 1750, and has since served variously as an inn, café, cinema, dancehall, and since 1978 as a bank and exhibition space.

== See also ==
- National Heritage Site (Belgium)
