= World Carrot Museum =

Website

The World Carrot Museum is a website about the collection, preservation, interpretation and exhibition of objects relating to the carrot. It is a virtual museum which has no brick and mortar existence. The website is maintained by John Stolarczyk of Skipton, England, and is run as a not-for-profit organisation.

== Background ==
The website contains an extensive history of the carrot in its wild and domesticated forms including a timeline, showing how its colour has changed over the millennia, from white and purple to the modern orange. It records the resurgence of popularity of the carrot during World War Two rationing, including information on the propaganda material and the alternative recipes and uses for carrot during the food shortages. The site also contains recipes and cultivation advice.

The World Carrot Museum contains a large collection of fine artworks containing images of carrots, in their various colors. Stolarczyk describes how paintings have often been used as sources in historical studies of crops, and plant biologists have been able to identify old species using historical artworks.

Writing in 2001, Dave Barry described the website as reflecting "a level of interest in carrots that would probably trouble a psychiatric professional". Stolarczyk was lead author of a paper on "Carrot History and Iconography" in 2011.

As of 2022, the museum site has been archived and is no longer updated.

== See also ==
- List of food and beverage museums
