= Wine Museum and Enoteca =

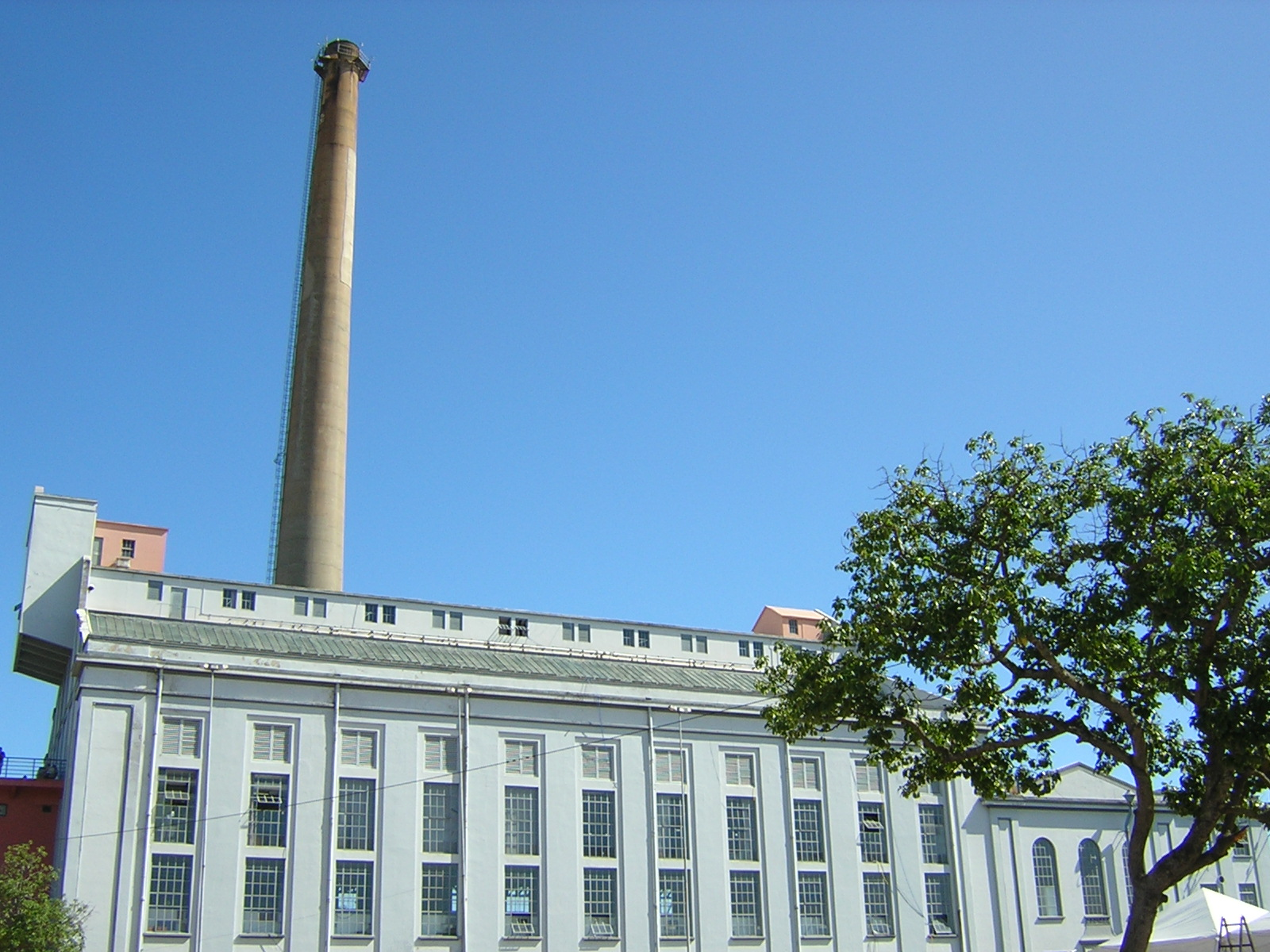
Usina do Gasômetro, where the museum is located.

The Wine Museum and Enoteca (in Portuguese, Museu do Vinho e Enoteca) is a Brazilian museum and enoteca, located in Porto Alegre in the old building of the plant's gas tank. The museum carries approximately 250 varieties of wines produced by 32 wineries in Rio Grande do Sul, with descriptive guidance to products. The Enoteca is the only wine museum in Brazil, with international standards comparable to the French, and the second in Latin America in the public domain. The collection of the museum also keeps parts and equipment used in the initial period of industrialization of wine.
