= Potato Museum =

American museum

The Potato Museum is a non-profit organisation dedicated to the history and social influence of the vegetable that has most influenced people and places. It is the world's largest collection of potato related items assembled from around the world.

== History ==
It started as a classroom project by the students of teacher Tom Hughes at The International School of Brussels, Belgium in 1975.

The museum was based in Washington, D.C., for several years and open by appointment only.

In the early 1990s The Potato Museum's collections were involved in two major national exhibitions, one at Ottawa's National Museum of Science and Technology, the other at the Smithsonian's National Museum of Natural History. The museum moved to Albuquerque, New Mexico, in 1993. Hughes and his wife, Meredith Hughes, started a spinoff website, the Food Museum, in 1996.

== Artifacts ==
The museum's collections include:

- Ancient specimens and pottery depicting potatoes
- Farm tools
- Modern potato-derived products
- Curiosities made from potatoes
