= Musée du Vin =

Wine museum in Paris, France

Musée du Vin (Wine Museum of Paris)
- Location within Paris
- Established: 1984
- Location: 5, Square Charles Dickens, Musée du Vin 75016 Paris, France
- Coordinates: 48.857473°N 2.284686°E
- Type: Corkscrews Wine production Harvest the grapes Wine tasting cup Ancient Wine bottles Cooperage Oenology Pottery
- Visitors: 22,100 (2008) 21,700 (2007) 19,300 (2006)
- Director: Mathieu Josse
- Curator: Jean-Jacques Hervy
- Public transit access: Passy Station
- Website: www.museeduvinparis.com

The Musée du Vin (French pronunciation: [myze dy vɛ̃], lit. 'Museum of the Wine') is a cultural venue in the 16th arrondissement located at 5, square Charles Dickens, Paris, France next to the Trocadéro and the Eiffel Tower. The nearest métro station is Passy. The museum opened in 1984.

== Overview ==
The museum testifies to the richness and diversity of the French craft of winemaking, through an exposure to tools and objects used to work the grapevine and the wine. The collection is shown in an old setting from the Middle Ages and arranged later in storerooms by the Order of the Minims of the Convent of Passy.

== History ==
Formerly, the hill where the winding galleries of the Wine Museum are located was covered by the vast oak forest. Around the 6th century, Nigeon village was growing on the heights of Chaillot, with its crops, vineyards and quarries.

In 1493, monks settled here. The area of their community extended to the present-day Water Street (Rue des Eaux). The building of the Abbaye de Passy began. The monks cultivated a few acres of vineyards in a closed street, which exist to this day. In the hill, they discovered ancient quarries where they created the cellars of the Abbey.

From the 17th century, Rue des Eaux is open water and allows visitors to access the Museum. The name of the street refers to the mineral springs found there and was in great vogue until 1785. Today, visitors can peer at it through a well shaft. The French Revolution of 1789 removed the religious orders in 1790 and terminated the life of the Abbey, which was gradually destroyed. Rediscovered a few years ago, the Wine Museum opened to the public in 1984.

The Paris Wine Museum is twinned with the Valais Vine and Wine Museum in Switzerland. The ceremony formalizing this pairing took place in March 2010 at the Paris Wine Museum.

== Description ==
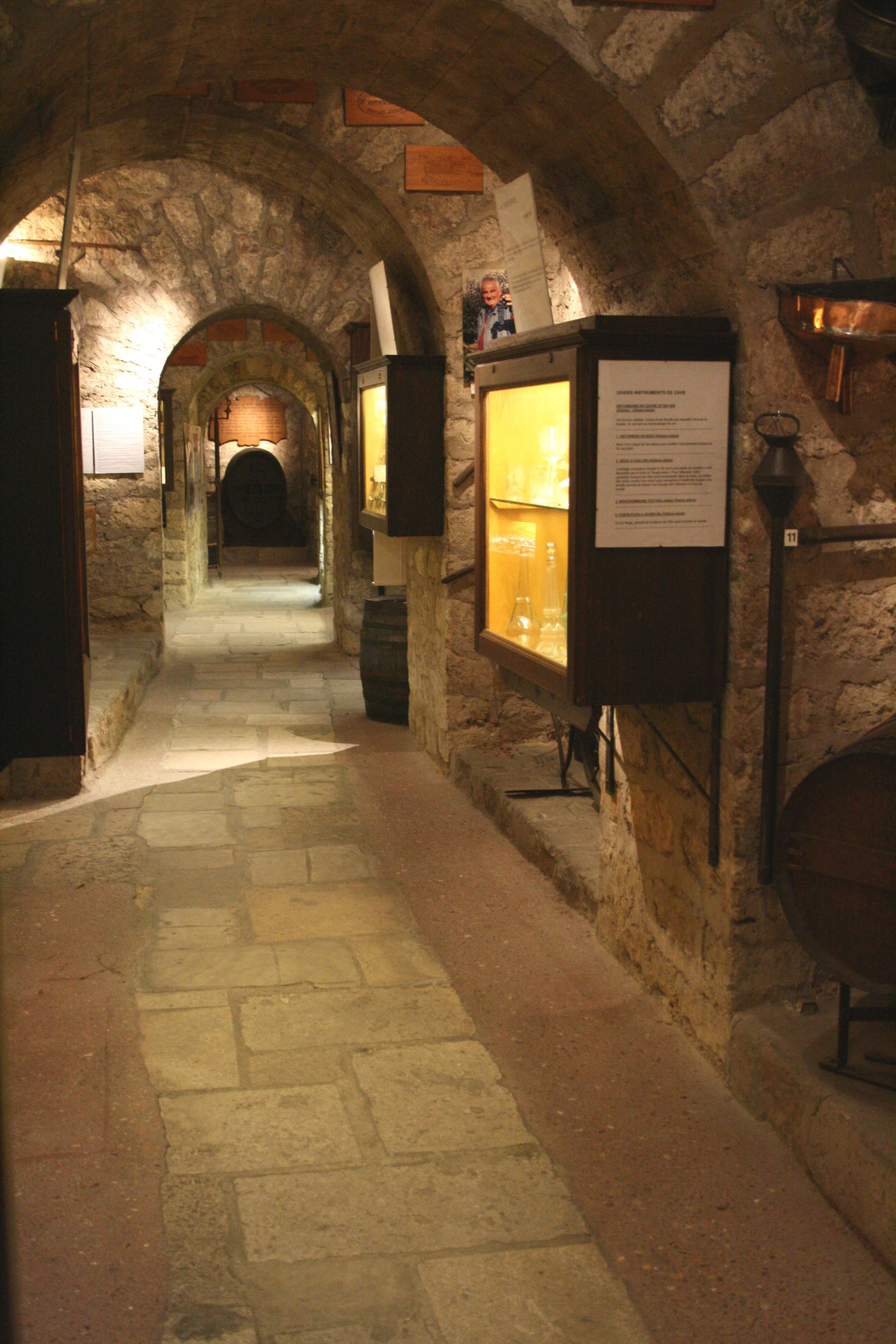
Wine Museum vaults.

The wine museum is located in old quarries of the Middle Ages, which were used as cellars in the 15th century. The brothers of the convent of the Minims (Passy) then produced wine very popular with King Louis XIII, from the wine harvest of the hillsides of the Seine. The Rue des Eaux, current location of the museum, takes its name from the discovery in the 17th century of hot springs that have been exploited for 200 years. The wine museum is owned by the Conseil des Echansons de France since 1984, a wine brotherhood gathering Amateur Wine purists in France and abroad, and which aims through the museum to "defend and promote the best wines of appellation of french origin" ("appellation d'origine contrôlée").

== Features ==
Rehabilitated after 1950, the former cellars of the convent of Minims served a while as cellars for the Eiffel Tower restaurants, before becoming the Wine Museum, owned since 1984 by the Conseil des Echansons de France. The Wine brotherhood, founded in 1954, aims to defend and promote best appellations of French terroirs. To this end, it organizes many prestigious events in France, abroad, and in the museum. It gathers around the world many thousands of professionals and amateurs who ensure the retention of expertise and quality that make the world-famous French wines. The "Conseil des Echansons de France" which runs the museum offers to the public a wide range of cultural activities and events on the subject of the vine and wine; and visits to the galleries where its collections are exposed. The collection is presented in the galleries beneath the hill of Passy.

== Collection ==
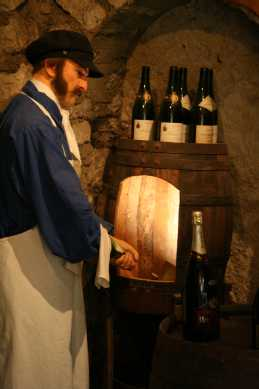
Wine Museum.

A rich collection of more than 2,000 pieces is presented on the tools of viticulture, winemaking and wine tasting. The oldest of them date back a century before Jesus Christ to the most recent of the 19th century. Wax figures, some historical such as Napoléon, Pasteur or Balzac, depict objects in the collection.

In France, more than two thousand years of expertise led to the development of world-famous wines. Generations of winemakers, winery masters, coopers and wine experts have continued to refine their techniques to produce the most prestigious wines. This exhibition pays tribute to their professions. It offers visitors the opportunity to recognize or discover traditional tools, sometimes quirky, often overlooked, which are now part of French heritage. Many in fact are no longer used and are now kept in private collections and museums. They show, for generations to come, the ingenuity of their inventors and the skill of those who mastered their use.

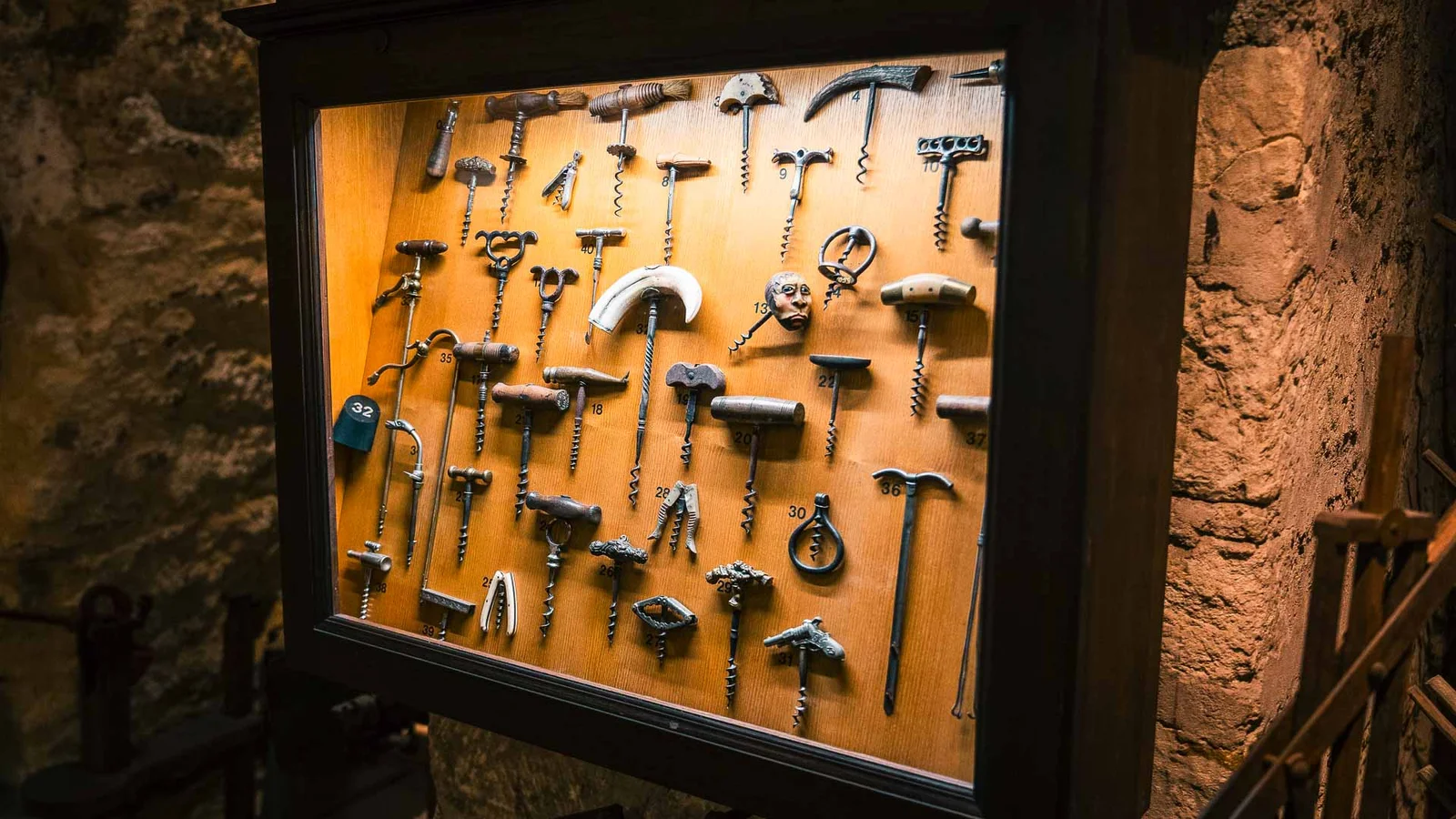
Collection of corkscrews at the Wine Museum in Paris.

The content of the exhibition includes:

- The tools of the vine
- The wine cellar
- Cooperage
- Wine and oenology
- Objects to serve and taste wine
- The traditions of the land

== See also ==
- List of museums in Paris
