= Food museum =

Museums that highlight food as a main topic

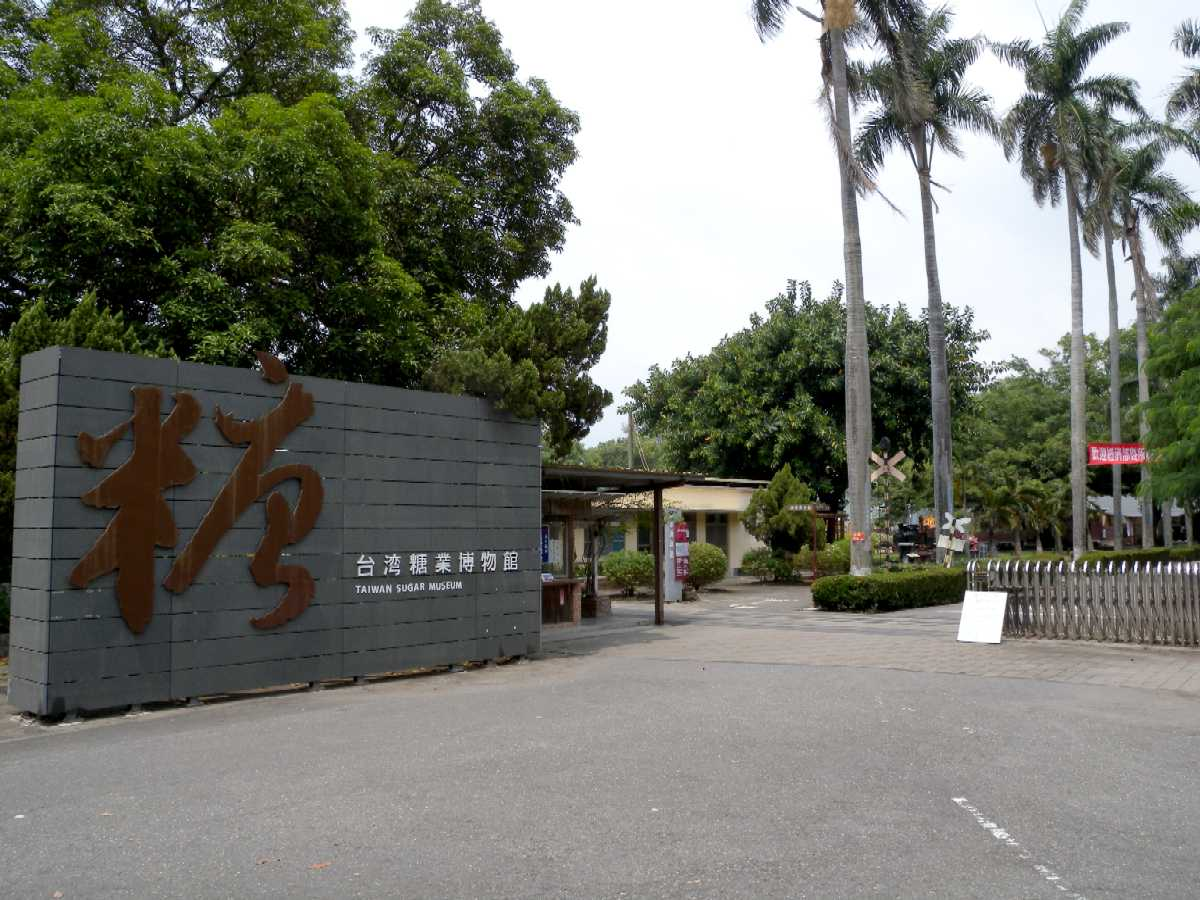
Taiwan Sugar Museum in Kaohsiung, Taiwan.

A food museum is a type of museum that is dedicated to food, including specific ingredients and dishes, as well as broader foodways. Exhibitions may explore the production, preparation, consumption, and cultural significance of food. Food museums can focus on particular cuisines or products, such as ramen, cheese, or kimchi, or examine food and eating more broadly. Their exhibitions may be permanent or temporary, including mobile exhibitions. Some food museums also incorporate interactive displays or multisensory experiences.

During the 2010s, food museums and food-related exhibitions became more prominent internationally. Examples include the Museum of Food and Drink in New York and the British Museum of Food in London, which opened temporarily in 2015. The growth of food museums has also been documented in China, where more than 143 had been established by 2018. The analysis linked this growth to increasing public interest in food media and the ability of food to provide insights into the past and help visitors connect with historical subjects.

Food is also featured in museums that are not exclusively dedicated to it, through exhibitions, restaurants, and other forms of programming. Some museums have a restaurant on site, with menu items that relate to the exhibitions. Living history museums can serve as food museums, displaying several aspects of food in a historical place and time.

The politics of food in museums has been analysed from an intersectional perspective. From that perspective, food exhibitions in the museums of the 19th century served a colonial purpose. By sorting and displaying the food of other cultures of the audience and curators, cultures could be established as Other. Food exhibitions can reproduce unequal power relations, and projects aiming to foster cross-cultural understanding do not always succeed.

== History ==
Food was presented to the public in museum-like settings before institutions devoted to food emerged. Historian Michelle Moon examines how food was interpreted through several nineteenth- and twentieth-century modes of display, including the historic preservation movement, industrial exhibitions, domestic science, model farms, and food tourism. She argues that these earlier patterns continue to limit efforts to connect historical interpretation with present-day questions.

Museums devoted to single food items are a more recent development, with many having been established by food companies themselves. An example of this is the Momofuku Ando Instant Ramen Museum, now the Cup Noodles Museum Osaka Ikeda. It opened in 1999 in Ikeda, Osaka, the city where Nissin Foods founder Momofuku Ando developed instant ramen.

The Canadian Review of American Studies described the study of food museums as having emerged over the previous decade in a 2019 review article. It draws on food studies, memory studies, museology, and culinary tourism, while noting that food museums themselves have existed for decades. The edited volume Food and Museums brought together contributors including culinary historians, artists, and chefs to examine the relationship between museums and food.

== Cultural Significance ==
Food museums present food in relation to place, identity, and cultural heritage. Research on food museums has examined how physical objects can evoke sensory experiences, memories, and identities associated with food. Food museums can provide spaces for shared cultural and culinary experiences. In a 2018 interview study at the Hangzhou Cuisine Museum in China, some visitors identified food as a way of learning about local history and culture. Research on visitors to the Hangzhou Cuisine Museum identified social interaction and family relationships as motivations for visiting, with museum visits and dining experiences providing opportunities for visitors to spend time with family and friends.

Food museums have also been examined in relation to national identity and nostalgia. In a study of the Shin-Yokohama Ramen Museum in Japan, anthropologist Satomi Fukutomi examines how the museum presents ramen as a national food and associates it with nostalgia for the Shōwa period (1955–1964). Fukutomi also discusses how the museum's recreated historical setting relates to the founder's childhood memories and nostalgia among visitors from different generations. Her study addresses the presentation and commercialisation of the past through food and museum displays.

More recent exhibitions have used food to explore historical inequalities. Curator Psyche Williams-Forson discusses how museum collecting, cataloguing, and labelling practices relate to the representation of historical inequalities. In the exhibition Fire & Freedom: Food & Enslavement in Early America at the US National Library of Medicine, Williams-Forson analyzes the contributions of enslaved people to American food culture, highlighting their creativity and resilience rather than reproducing narratives focused on slaveholders.

== Impact on Tourism ==
Food museums have increasingly become attractions within culinary and cultural tourism. Through exhibitions, interactive displays, restaurants and tastings, they allow visitors to explore the history, production and cultural significance of regional cuisines.

Food museums can also contribute to destination identity by presenting regional culinary traditions as expressions of local history and culture. Park et al. examine visitors’ educational and sensory motivations for visiting food museum restaurants, including their interest in learning about food and experiencing it through tasting. Integrating restaurants and culinary activities with exhibitions allows visitors to connect cultural information with direct food experiences.

== See also ==
- List of food and beverage museums
