= Gnomes of Zurich =

Derogatory nickname

Gnomes of Zurich is a disparaging term for Swiss bankers. Swiss bankers are popularly associated with extremely secretive policies, while gnomes in fairy tales live underground, in secret, counting their riches. Zürich is the commercial centre of Switzerland.

== History ==
After World War II, British Labour party politicians were worried about speculation against the pound undermining the economic regime. Economic growth in the United Kingdom was low, only half that of Germany and France. The demand for pound sterling started to fall.

Although Swiss bankers had been criticised in Britain since the 1950s, the term "gnomes of Zürich" originated in a crisis meeting of the Labour politicians in November 1964. The politicians blamed Swiss bankers for raising speculation against the pound. During the meeting, politician George Brown criticised the Swiss bankers and said, "The gnomes of Zürich are at work again." The term "Gnomes of Zürich" was then used by many other politicians of the time. Then Prime Minister, Harold Wilson vowed to resist the gnomes' sinister power.

Paul Rossy, a top banker in Zürich at the time, stated, "In the world it is not the image, but the substance behind the image which counts." The phrase "gnomes of Zürich" was adopted by the Americans as well.

== Impact ==
Soon after the catchphrase became famous, a few Swiss bankers started answering their phone as "Hello, gnome speaking". A Swiss banker who moved to London was nicknamed the gnome of Notting Hill. The phrase also gave name to the 1966 T. R. Fehrenbach book on the history and practices of Swiss private banking, The Gnomes of Zurich. The Wall Street Journal listed the gnomes of Zurich with the military-industrial complex, The Establishment, and Illuminati as part of the shadow government.

In the early 21st century, Zürich bankers are still very wealthy, but less powerful compared to London, New York, Dubai, and Shanghai as leading financial capitals. The Zürich Money Museum displays the sculpture of a gnome - founder Jürg Conzett says that nowadays, bankers see gnome as almost a noble title. Bankers currently based in London who are agitated by rising taxes, stricter regulation and public animosity towards investment banking have considered moving in large numbers to Zürich itself, where banking is "the state religion".

== Other uses ==
- The lost 1969 British television sitcom The Gnomes of Dulwich is an allusion to the phrase.
- The phrase is reflected in the traditions of the Zürich Grasshoppers Rugby Club, whose mascot is a gnome and which occasionally plays a third/casual team called the Gnomes.
- Gnomes of Zurich is also the name of a 1960s rock band from North East England, and a 1990s psychedelic rock band from Minneapolis.
- The Gnomes of Zürich are one of the playable factions in Steve Jackson's card game of conspiracy, Illuminati. Their goal is to collect a specified amount of megabucks, the game's currency.
- The phrase is reflected in the Black Swan Man comic, where the main character gained deep financial knowledge by living with Alpine gnomes in his youth.
- The original version of the computer game Zork makes reference to an "epicene gnome of Zurich".
- Valiant Comics' Archer & Armstrong features a group of literal gnomes referred to as the Gnomes of Zurich, one of many factions within the Sect formed to kill the titular Armstrong.
- The Cyberpunk 2020 adventure-book Northwest Passage plays on the term by featuring a stockbroker family called the Zuriches in the city of Nome.
