= Money Museum =

Money Museum may refer to:

- ANA Money Museum, at the headquarters of the American Numismatic Association in Colorado Springs, Colorado
- The Money Museum, at the Federal Reserve Bank of Chicago
- The Learning Center and Money Museum, at the Federal Reserve Bank of Cleveland
- The Money Museum, at the Federal Reserve Bank of Kansas City
- Money Museum of the Deutsche Bundesbank in Frankfurt am Main
- MoneyMuseum (Zurich)
- Museum on the Mound, a money museum in the headquarters of HBOS
- SAMA Money Museum, Riyadh, Saudi Arabia
