= Dottenwil Castle =

Castle in Switzerland

- Schloss Dottenwil
- Dottenwil, Wittenbach
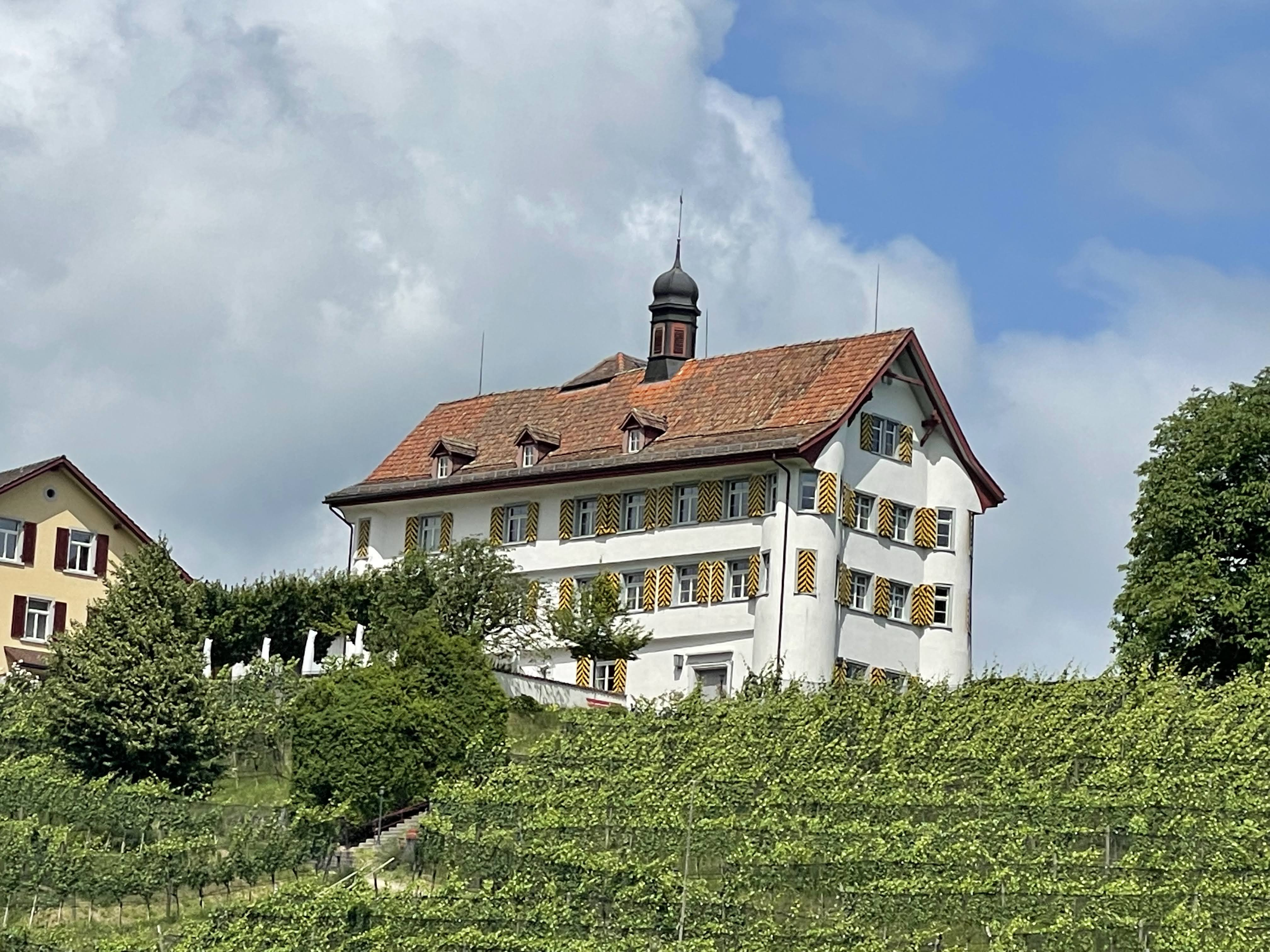
- Dottenwil Castle in 2022

Site information
- Type: Castle
- Code: CH-SG

Location
- Coordinates: 47°28′38″N 9°22′38″E

Site history
- Built: 1543

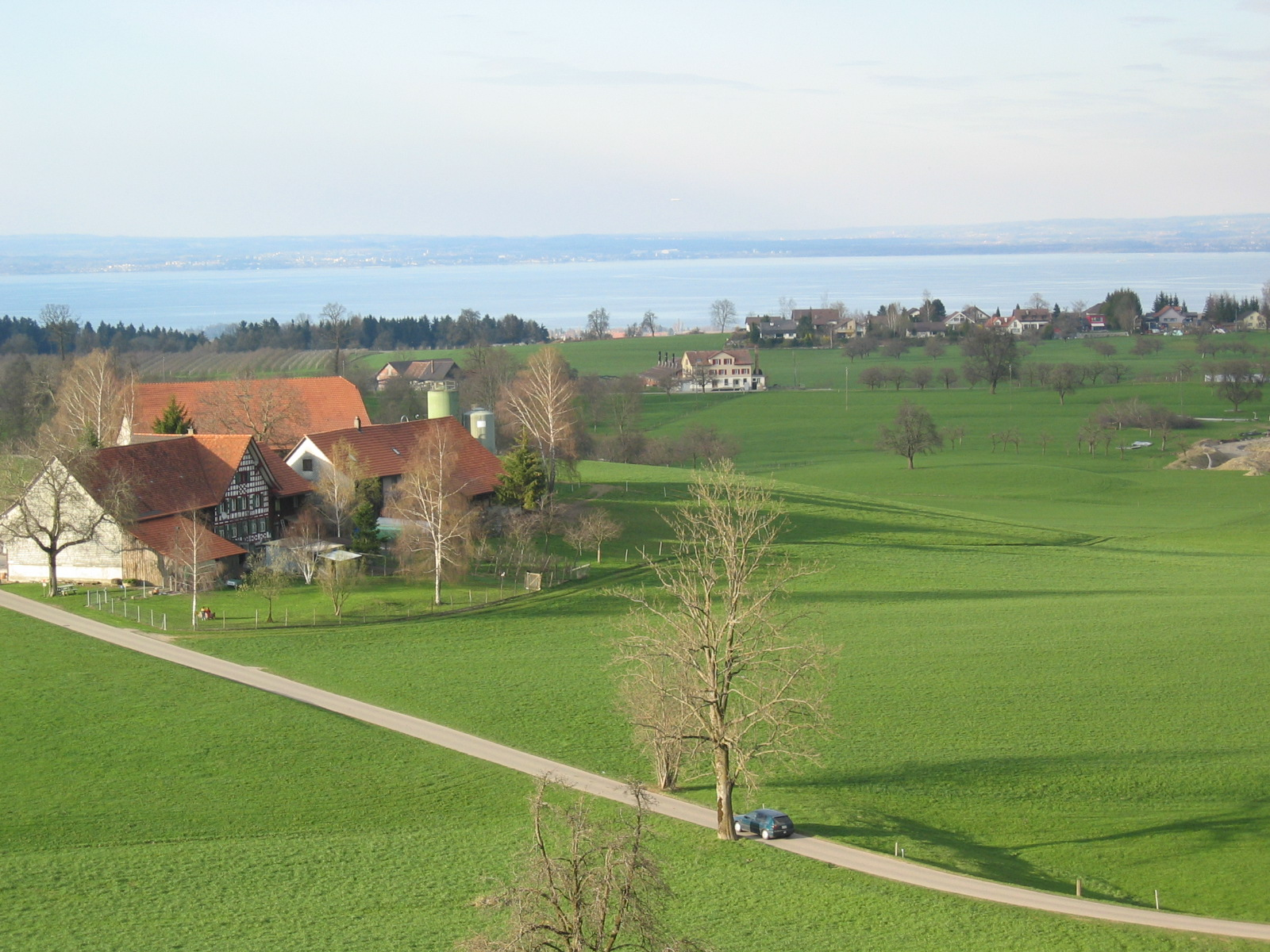
View from Dottenwil Castle to Lake Constance

Dottenwil Castle (German: Schloss Dottenwil) is a castle in the municipality of Wittenbach, St. Gallen. It is located on a drumlin 1.5 km (0.93 mi) north of Wittenbach, next to the hamlet of Dottenwil.

== History ==
The first mention of the Dottenwil estate was in 1302, but it wasn't until 1543 that Peter Graf, a wealthy resident of St. Gallen, built a castle on the site. His daughter Weibratha inherited the castle and estate in 1587. She was married to the merchant Konrad Atzenholz, who expanded the castle to its current size around the end of the 16th century. The expansion included extending it on two sides, as well as adding corner towers.

After changing hands multiple times, the castle was bought for 7000 Guilder by Johann Baptist Blattmann, former governor of Aegeri, who built a large spa house and garden next to the castle. Although the castle, now a hotel, had a lot of success, Blattmann had gotten himself into a lot of debt and the castle was eventually auctioned off by creditors in 1816.

After the seizure and subsequent auction of the castle and estate, they changed hands multiple times until the community of Wittenbach purchased the castle and estate in 1886. Four years later in 1890, a turret with a bell was installed on the roof of the building. On New Year's Day in 1901, the spa house fell victim to a fire. It was subsequently rebuilt, albeit significantly smaller.

== Renovation work ==
Multiple renovations were carried out in the 1950s and 60s, during which the well behind the castle was demolished and covered, among other things. Most of the interior decorations such as paintings and inlays were lost during these renovations, with the few remaining pieces being saved and stored in the local museum, where they have been since 1962. The neo-gothic chapel was modernized, and the old pictures were loaned to the Oberrindal Chapel.

The castle served as a retirement home until the end of 1997, at which point an interest group, headed by Paul Huber, was formed with the aim of using the castle for cultural purposes. The city decided to allow the interest group a three-year trial operation, after which a loan agreement was signed. It was extended multiple times, most recently at the end of 2021 for five more years until 2026.

With the start of the trial operation, extensive renovation work began. The roof, facades, and windows were all renovated, and the community invested over 1 million francs into the renovation of the interior and the operating facilities. As of 2018, about 200,000 hours of work had been invested into the castle's renovation. For their management of the castle, the interest group has received various awards, including the Recognition Award from the St. Gallen Cultural Foundation in 2006 and the Volunteer Award from the Swiss Non-Profit Society in 2011.

== Current operations ==
As of current, The interest group managing the castle pays 10 percent of the annual income to the community as rent for the use of the castle. The castle has been operating as a museum since 1998, and is still in operation as of 2023, with many different exhibits available to the public. There is also a restaurant in the castle.

== See also ==
- List of castles and fortresses in Switzerland
- List of museums in Switzerland
