= Musée jurassien d'art et d'histoire =

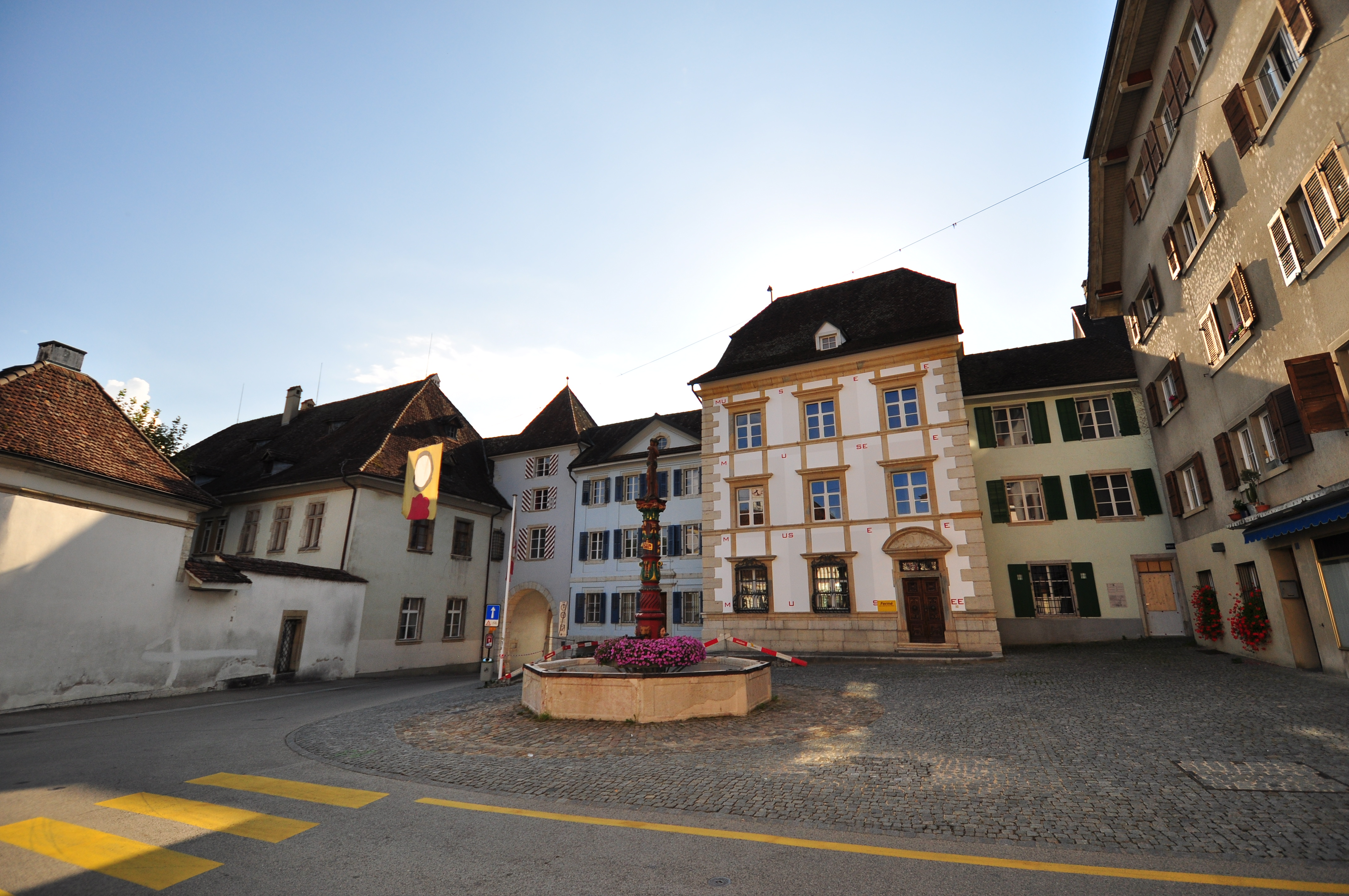

- Location within Switzerland
- Former name: Musée jurassien
- Established: 1909
- Location: Delémont, Canton of Jura, Switzerland
- Coordinates: 47.3645°N 7.3420°E
- Type: Art museum, history museum
- Collections: Sculpture, fine art, archaeology, documents, ethnography
- Founder: Arthur Daucourt
- President: Anne Seydoux-Christe
- Curator: Nathalie Fleury
- Public transit access: 10-minute walk from the Delémont station of the Swiss Federal Railways
- Parking: 5-minute walk from the Gros Pré free car-park
- Website: www.mjah.ch/e

The Musée jurassien d'art et d'histoire is a museum of art and a nexus of public learning in Delémont, Canton of Jura, Switzerland.

== History ==
The museum was founded as the Musée jurassien by the historian Abbot Arthur Daucourt in 1909 as a place to "strengthen and revive a love of the region in children's hearts". Daucourt had retired to the area in 1905. Initially housed within the Collège de Delémont, the Musée moved to its own quarters in Maison Bennot in 1922. When the Canton of Jura was established in 1979, the institution was given its current name, Musée jurassien d'art et d'histoire. The Musée underwent a complete restoration in 2011.

== Galleries ==
The Musée features seven permanent galleries: Le Jura, featuring historical and ethnographic artifacts from the canton; Le Jurassique, displaying the geologic history of the area; La tête de moine, church relics from the Jura; Ferme – Sapin – Cheval, iconic images of the people and geography of the Jura; Un drapeau, exploring the region through the canton flag; La décolleteuse, the Swiss watchmaking and microengineering industry; and Le bout du monde, explaining the remoteness of Jura canton.

== Significant exhibitions ==
In 2005, the Musée hosted a retrospective look at the work of sculptor and engraver Laurent Boillat, commemorating the 20th anniversary of his death. In 2010, the Musée presented a large exhibition of the work of local surrealist painter and sculptor Gérard Bregnard. More recently, in the summer of 2018, the Musée hosted a "then-and-now" look at the Jura region through the 19th century photography of Édouard Quiquerez and modern images by Pierre Montavon.

== See also ==
- List of museums in Switzerland
