= Skulpturhalle Basel =

Swiss museum

Coordinates: 47°33′37″N 7°34′45″E

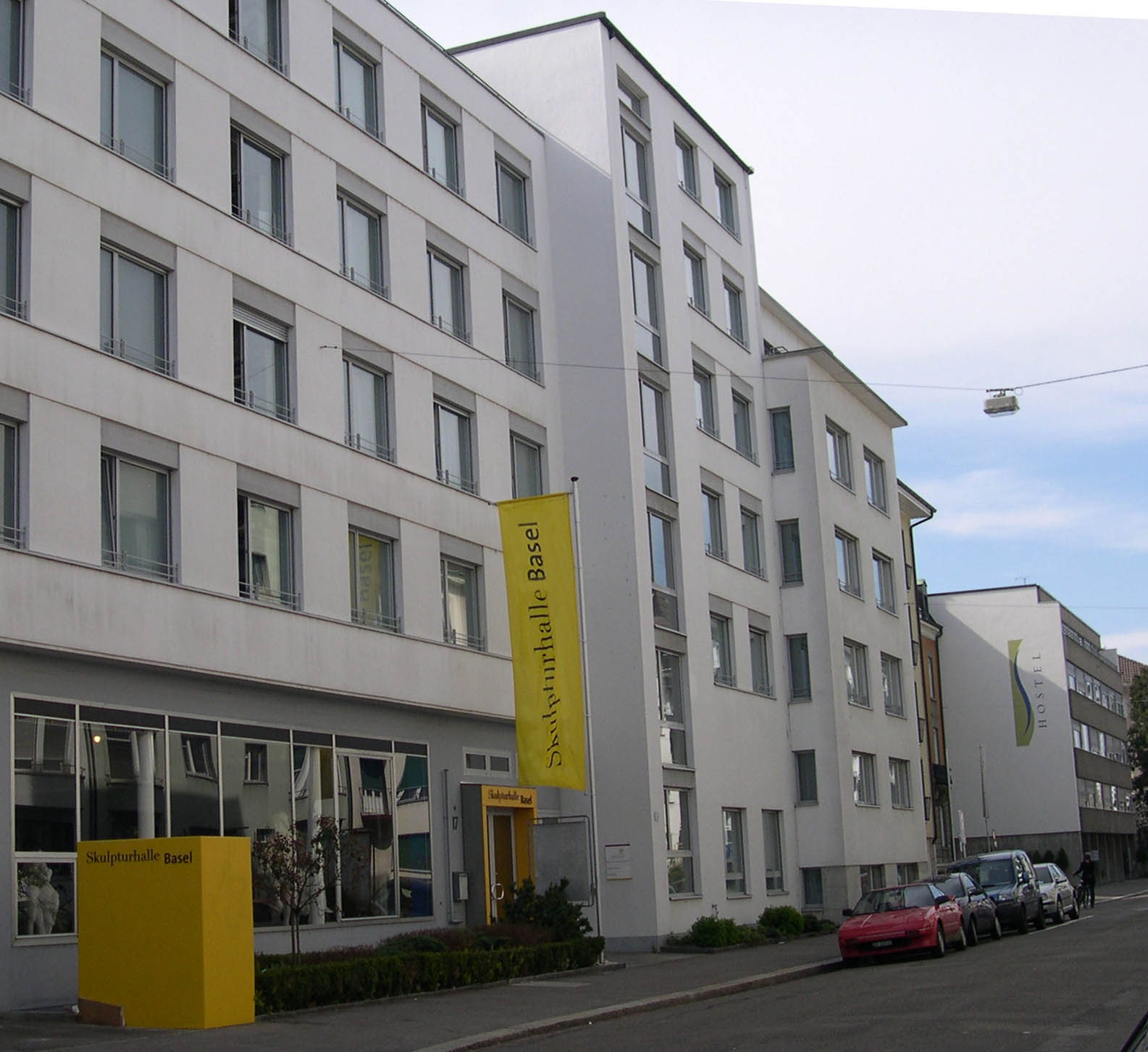
Skulpturhalle entrance

The Skulpturhalle Basel is a museum in Basel, Switzerland, featuring cast replicas of antique sculpture. With around 2,000 casts, it is the largest collection of its kind in the country, due to its tripling in size between 1985 and 2010. Since 1961, the collection has been managed by the Antikenmuseum Basel.

The collection was started in 1830. From 1849 it was located in the newly opened Museum an der Augustinergasse (now the location of the Natural History Museum and the Museum of Cultures). In 1887 it moved into the Basel Kunsthalle, where a new wing known as the "Skulpturenhalle" had been built especially for it. The casts had to be warehoused in 1927 when the national art collection was temporarily moved into the Kunsthalle, creating a need for more space. In 1940 the cast collection found a provisional home in a disused factory, four years after plans for a new building had failed to pass a referendum; the new building finally materialised in 1963.

When original works are split into pieces across various museums, the casts allow all the parts to be brought back together so that complete reconstructions of antique sculptures can be made. The unique "Parthenon Project" assembles casts of every surviving sculptural remnant from the Parthenon Temple in Athens, and exhibits them so as to demonstrate their original arrangements. Also in the exhibition is an array of architectural models on a scale of 1:20.

== See also ==
- List of museums in Switzerland
- Museums in Basel
