= Enea Tree Museum =

Park in Rapperswil-Jona, Switzerland

Coordinates: 47.223386°N 8.865667°E

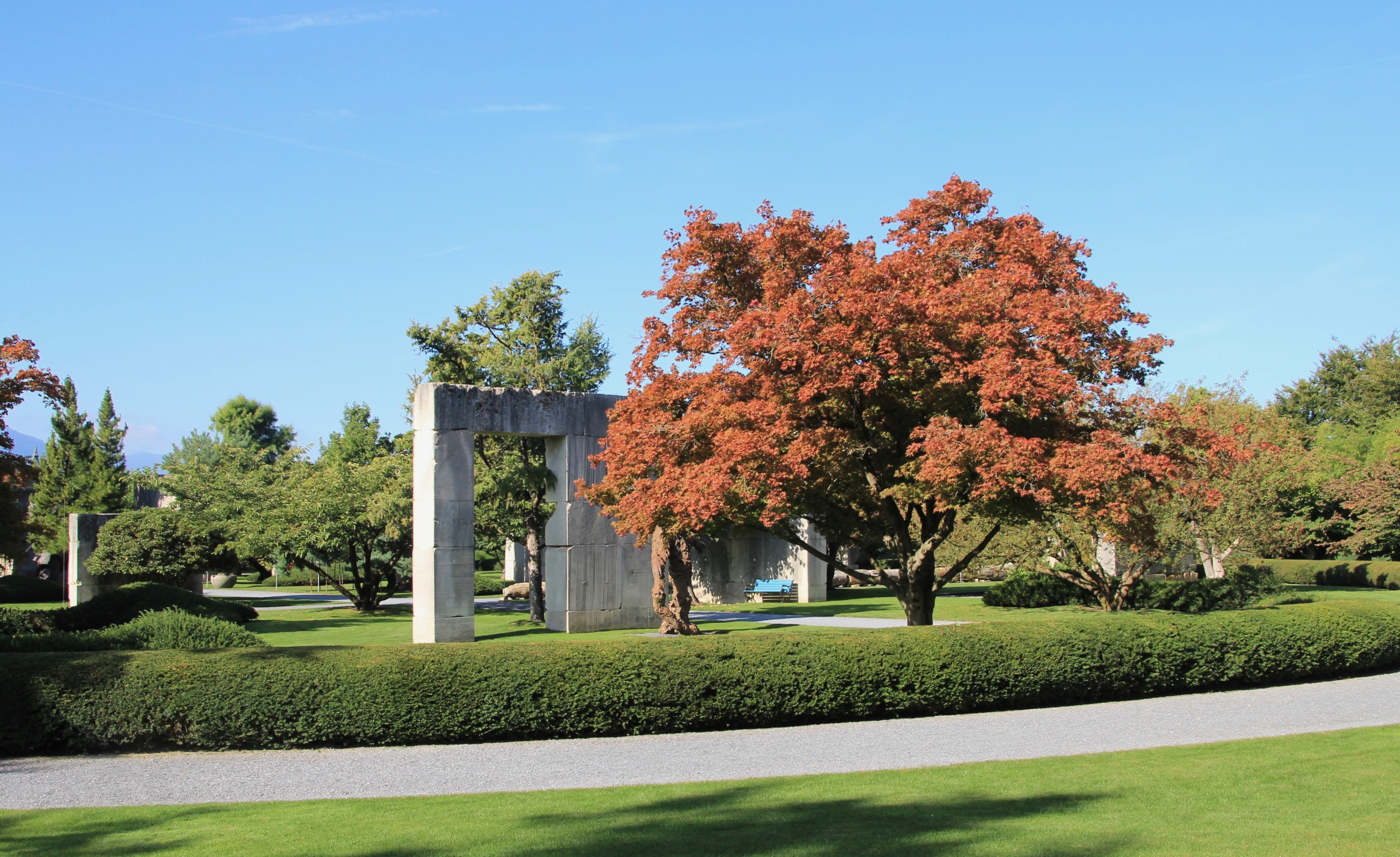
Enea Tree Museum, Rapperswil-Jona, Switzerland

The Enea Tree Museum is a 75,000 m^{2} park near Lake Zurich in Rapperswil-Jona, Canton of St. Gallen, Switzerland. The tree museum shows over 50 trees from over 25 species as well as sculptures by international artists.

== History ==
The tree museum, founded in 2010, was planned and built by landscape architect Enzo Enea. The property at Lake Zürich was leased from the Mariazell-Wurmsbach Cistercian Abbey. Before the construction, water had to be extracted from the former wetland. For this purpose, an avenue of swamp cypresses was set up. This tree species naturally extracts a lot of water from the soil (evapotranspiration). Today this avenue forms the entrance to the tree museum. The museum has been open to the public since it opened.

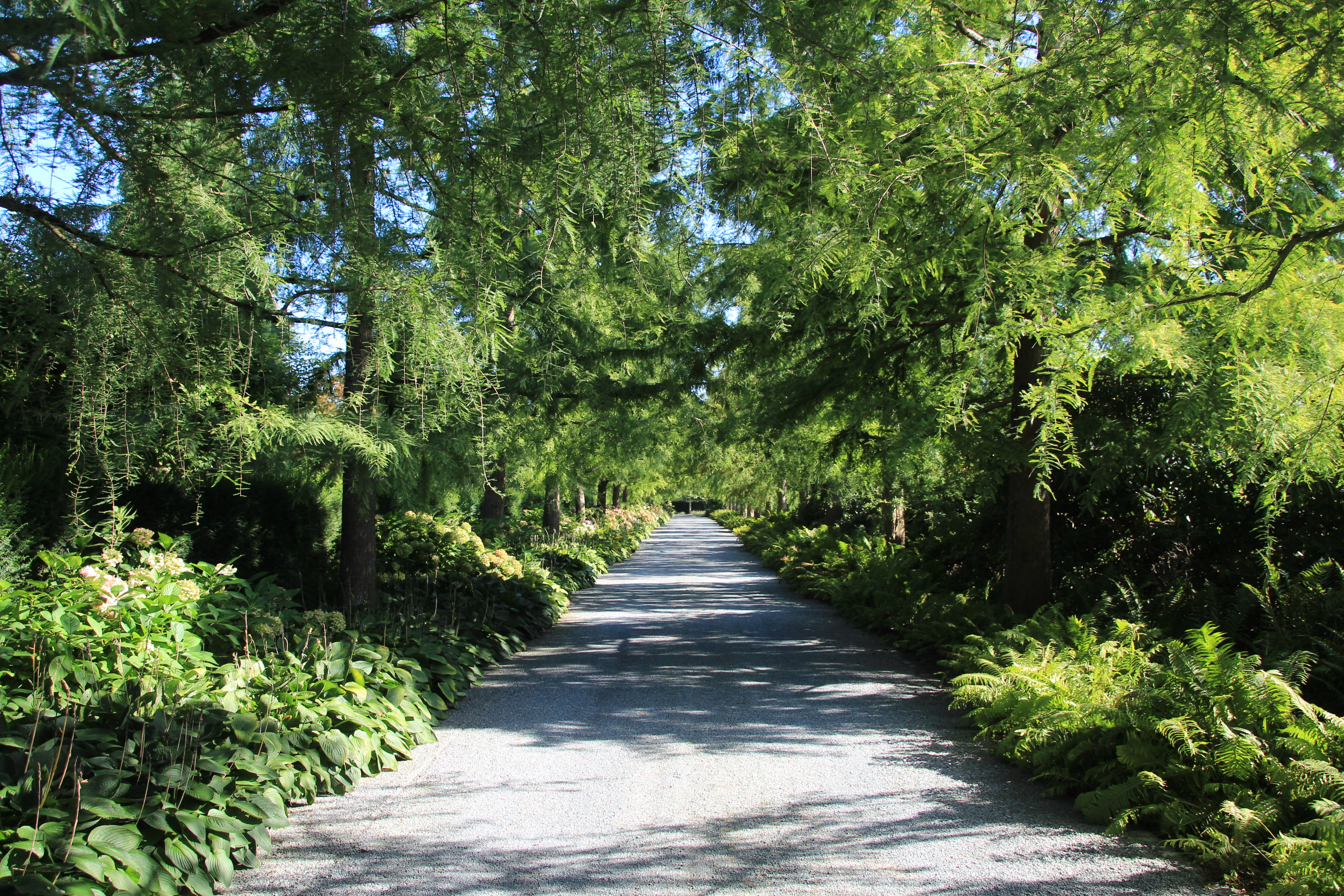
Access

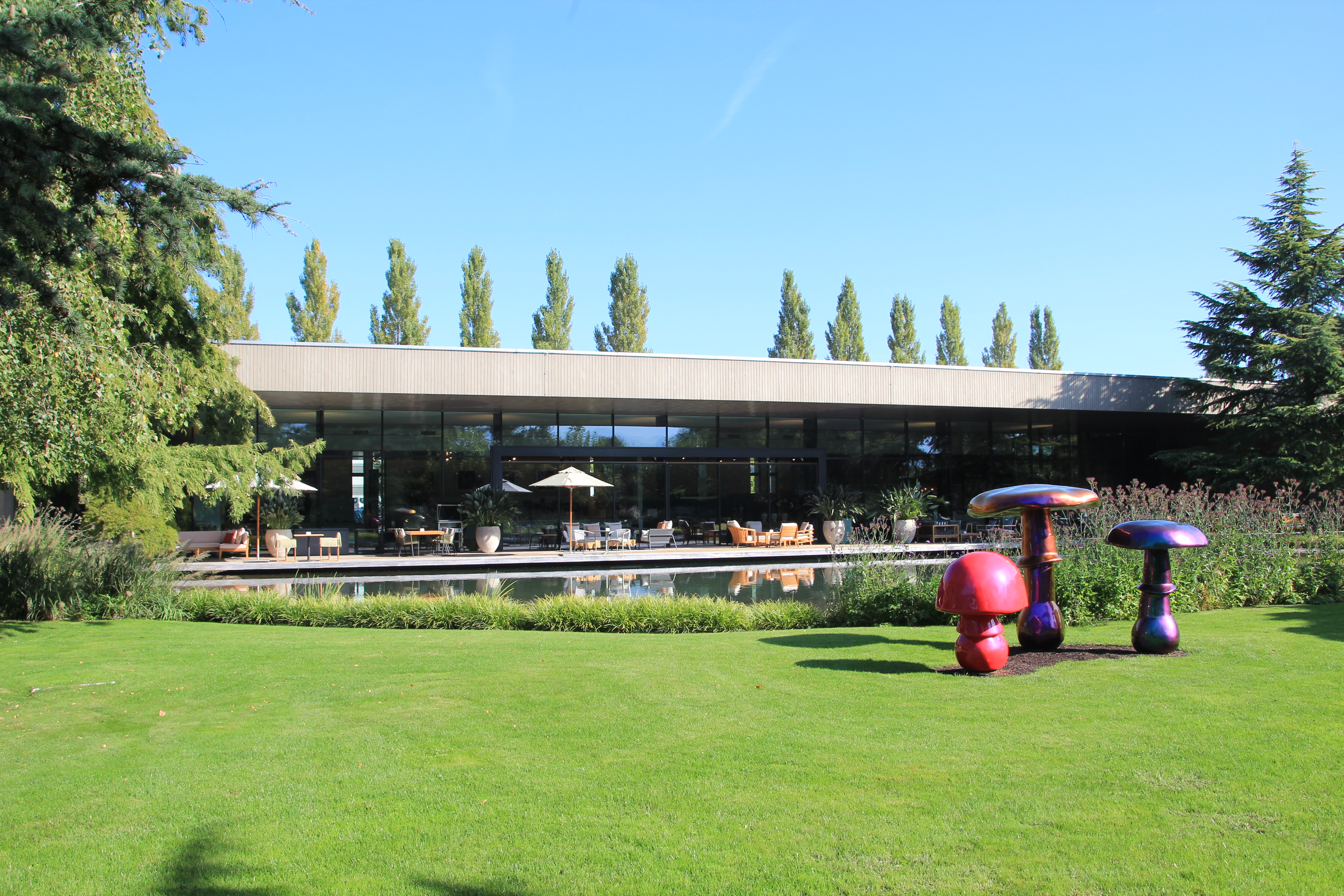
Reception building and café

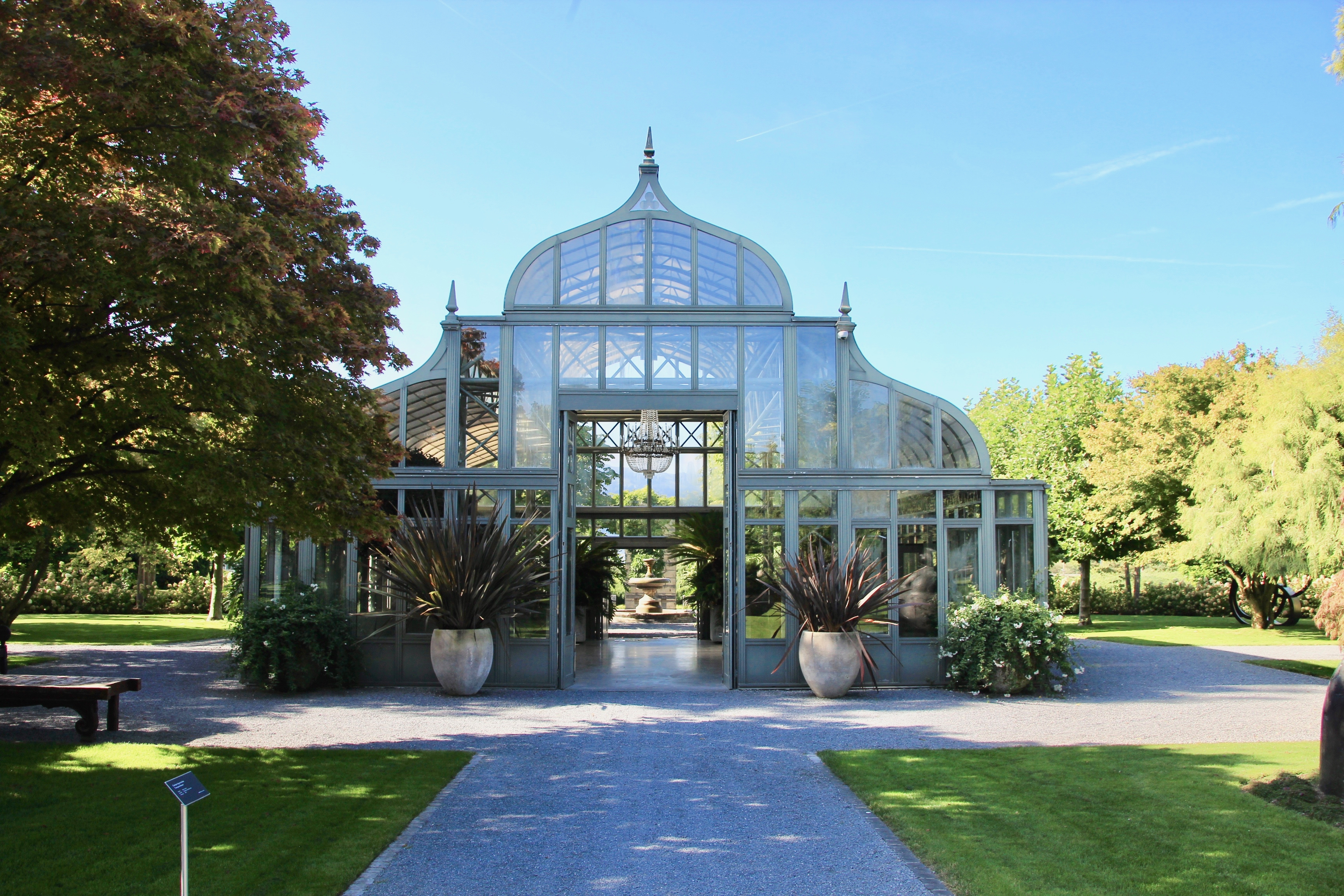
Orangery

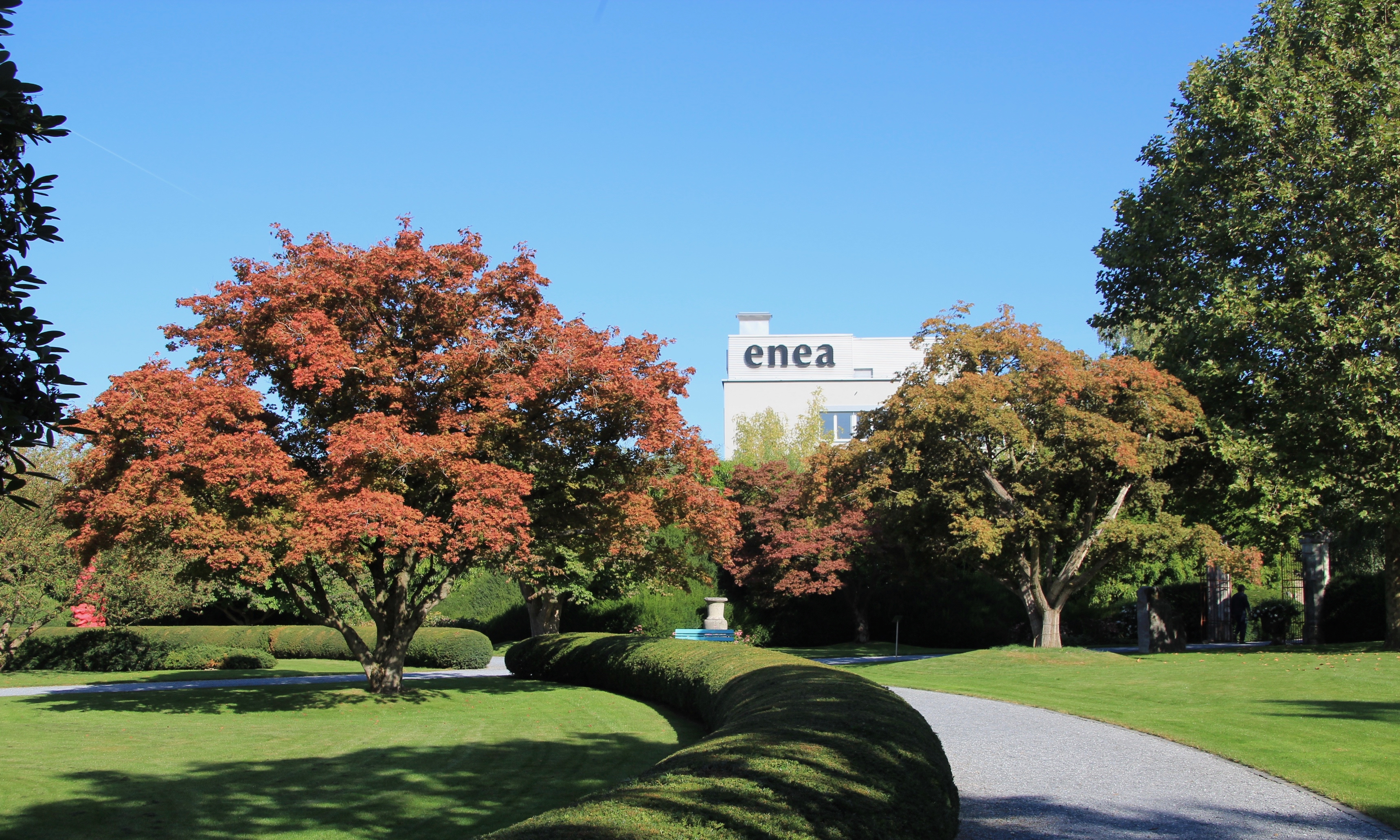
The main building in the background

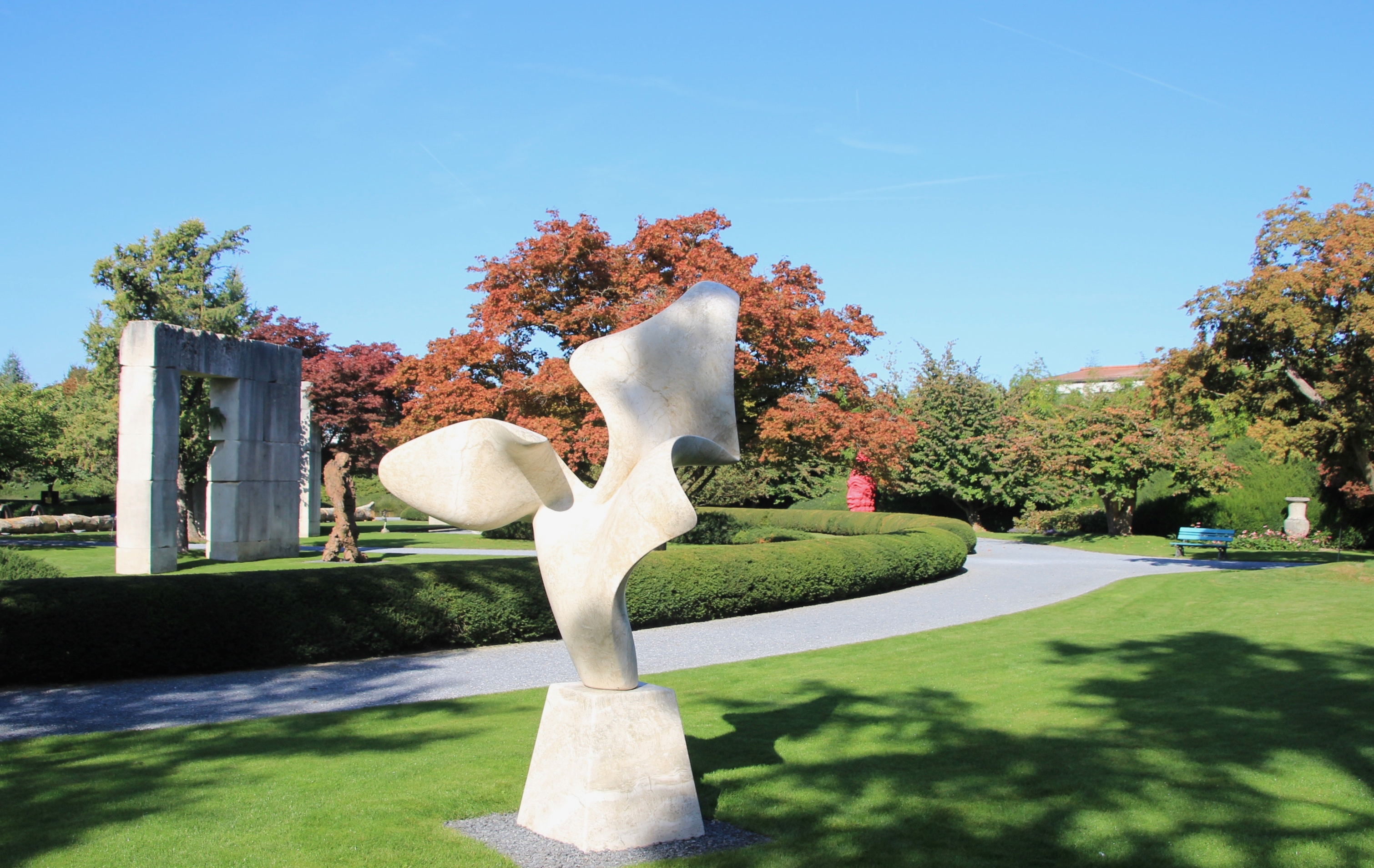
In the park

== Tree population ==
The trees growing in the tree museum should have been felled, but were rescued by Enea and replanted in the tree museum. The following specimens belong to the tree population:

- Fan Maple (Acer palmatum)
- Persian Ironwood (Parrotia persica)
- Japanese larch (Larix kaempferi 'Diana')
- Japanese cherry (Prunus serrulata)
- Umbrella Pine (Sciadopitys verticillata)
- Flowering ash (Fraxinus ornus)
- Scots Pine (Pinus sylvestris)
- Japanese Yew (Taxus cuspidata)
- Catawba rhododendron (Rhododendron Catawbiense)
- Giant sequoia (Sequoiadendron giganteum)
- Catalpa (Catalpa bignonioides)
- Common plum (Prunus domestica)
- Hinoki cypress (Chamaecyparis obtusa 'Nana Gracilis')
- London plane (Platanus × hispanica)
- Chinese Junipers (Juniperus media 'Hetzii')
- Chinese Magnolia (Magnolia x soulangeana)
- Japanese black pine (Pinus thunbergii)
- Dutch Elm (Ulmus x hollandica 'Jacqueline Hillier')
- Bald cypress (Taxodium distichum)
- Full moon maple (Acer japonicum 'Aconitifolium')
- Paperback Maple (Acer griseum)
- Maidenhair tree (Ginkgo biloba)
- Horse-chestnut Tree (Aesculus hippocastanum)
- Sargent crabapple (Malus toringo sargentii)
- Japanese maple (A. palmatum 'Dissectum Garnet')
- White pine (Pinus parviflora)
- Small-leaved lime (Tilia cordata)

== Art ==
Sculptures by international artists can be found in the tree museum. The following works of art are curated in the Tree Museum:

- 3 Königinnen, Risch / Duosch
- Alpaka, Jürgen Drescher
- Animello, Sergio Tappa
- Antenna, Steve Claydon
- Around Tiger Island, Nigel Hall
- Berserker II, Stalla Hamberg
- Bird, Cristian Andersen
- Dew of Moon, Masatoshi Izumi
- Fiora, Richard Erdmann
- Fiora – Working Model, Richard Erdmann
- Fiore, Manolo Valdés
- Inselbuch, Das, Martin Kippenberger
- Infanta Margarita, Manolo Valdés
- Lou, Jaume Plensa
- Meander, James Licini
- Mushrooms, Sylvie Fleury
- Pulpo Otto, Jeremie Crettol
- Remos Schnauz, Sergio Tappa
- Relay, Kerim Seiler
- Schweinebauch, Olaf Nicolai
- Sentinel, Richard Erdman
- Sentinel – Working Model, Richard Erdmann
- Sentinel, Jaume Plensa
- Sleeping Mountain, Masatoshi Izumi
- Snailholesuperlove, Jeremie Crettol
- Southern Shade V, Nigel Hall
- Spira, Richard Erdmann
- Unlimited & Limiters, Steve Claydon
- Wasserhahn, Risch / Duosch
- WVZ 147, Elmar Trenkwalder

== See also ==
- List of museums in Switzerland
