= Natural History Museum of Fribourg =

Coordinates: 46.7931°N 7.1571°E

- Naturhistorisches Museum Freiburg (in German), Musée d'histoire naturelle de Fribourg (in French)
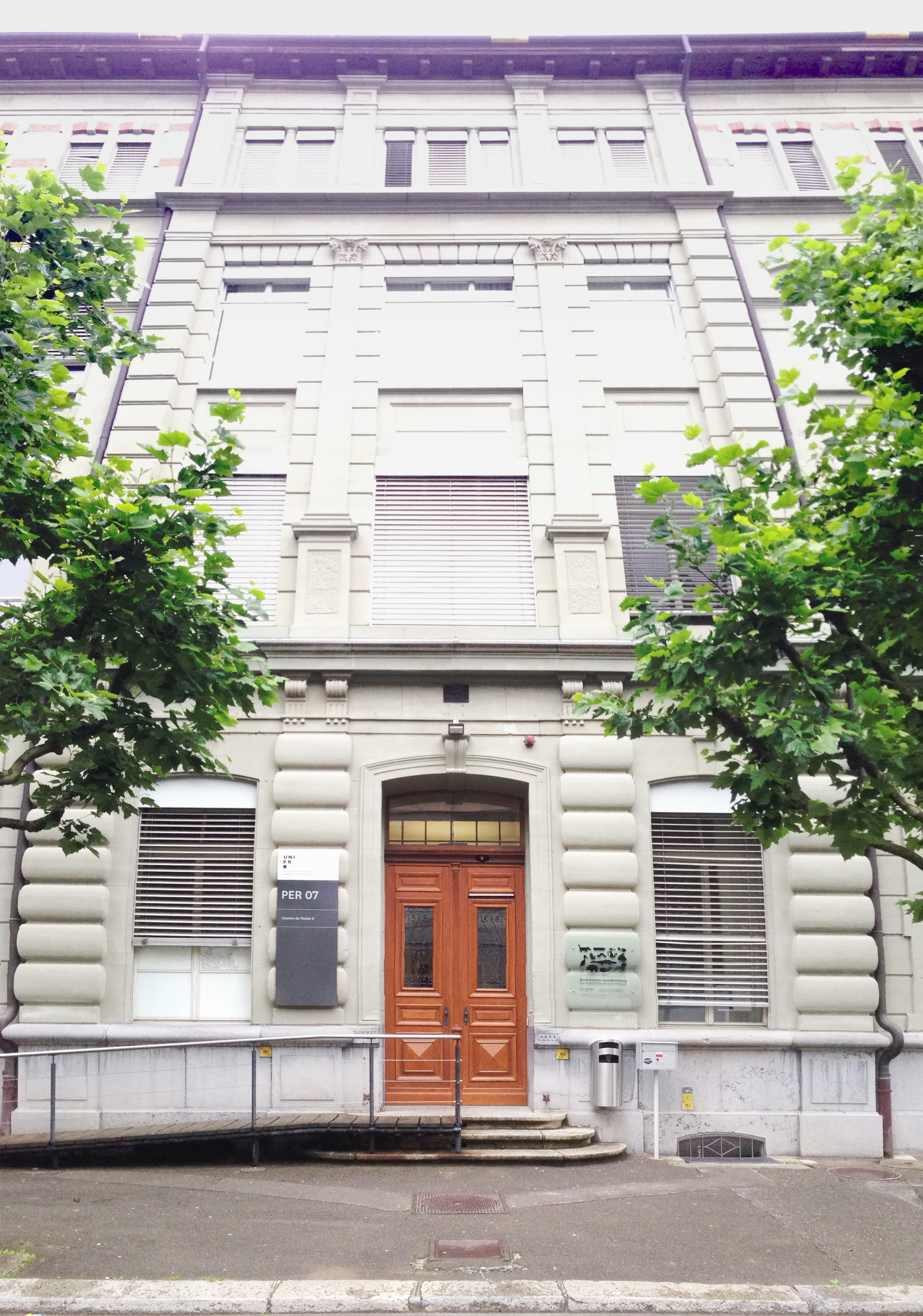
- Location: Fribourg, Switzerland
- Type: Science museum
- Website: http://www.fr.ch/mhn/de/pub/index.cfm

The Natural History Museum of Fribourg (Switzerland) was established in 1823 with the aim of providing the public with a better understanding of nature, especially the natural heritage of the Fribourg region. It also serves as a regional center of expertise for flora, fauna, and nature conservation. The Natural History Museum of Fribourg is a bilingual museum (French and German).

== History ==
The museum was founded in 1823, due to a bequest from Canon Charles-Aloyse Fontaine, which laid the foundation for its collections. Since then, its collections have continued to grow through donations and acquisitions. The museum's collections were initially housed at Collège Saint-Michel until 1897 when the museum relocated to Pérolles, where it shares premises with the Faculty of Sciences at the University of Fribourg.

== Collections ==
=== Botany ===
The Natural History Museum houses several herbaria, including the Jaquet herbarium with over 20,000 plant specimens, as well as a collection of freeze-dried mushrooms. These herbaria can be accessed online.

=== Earth science ===
The mineralogy collection includes numerous Alpine crystals, meteorites, and erratics. The museum also houses the Baumhauer collection of minerals from Lengenbach (Binntal). The paleontology collections contain fossils from the region, such as Halithérium, a sirenian found in the Swiss Plateau molasse, as well as fossils from around the world, including Orthacanthus, a shark dating back over 260 million years, and some holotypes such as the primitive amphibian Raumbachia, which exhibits many fish-like characteristics. In the field of geography, a relief map of the Aletsch Glacier, created in 1916, highlights the retreat of glaciers.

=== Zoology ===
The zoology collections primarily consist of representatives of the regional fauna, including a collection of Swiss beetles. Some notable items are on display, such as the world's only naturalized whale, the rare Aepyornis egg, the Siberian Tiger, the Bonobo, and the Orangutan.

== Exhibitions ==
=== Temporary exhibitions ===
Since 1976, the museum has organized 5-6 temporary exhibitions per year.

- "Tic tac – the countdown of life" from June 10, 2022, to January 9, 2023
- "Hannetons - #4 Biodiversity Fribourg" from July 1, 2022, to September 4, 2021
- "Chiroptera" in 2016

=== Permanent exhibition ===
The permanent exhibition includes the following sections:

- Mineralogy
- History of the Earth
- Geology
- Regional Fauna
- General Zoology: This section is divided into several thematic exhibitions, including two general sections dedicated to vertebrates and invertebrates, a room specifically focused on birds and their evolution (And the Scale Became Feather), and a space dedicated to fish, amphibians, and reptiles.

== Scientific projects and activities ==
The museum conducts several scientific projects aimed at enhancing knowledge of the regional natural heritage and raising awareness about nature conservation.

The "Flore des préalpes" project aims to better understand, study, and protect the flora of this region.

The satellite tracking of bird migrations helps to gain insights into species, inform scientists about migration distances, and the challenges birds face. This project also provides real-time information to the public, raising awareness about bird conservation. Over 40 birds of five different species have been tracked by satellite (White Stork, Red Kite, Long-tailed Skua, Snowy Owl, and Eurasian Eagle-Owl). The data from these tracking efforts are available on the museum's website.

Workshops for parents and children are organized and led by cultural mediators, such as "Little Geologists" on September 3, 2022.

== Wildlife Care Station ==
The museum offers this service, where two veterinary assistants work since veterinarians are not allowed to care for wildlife, and the public is not permitted to take in wild animals. The station specializes in small animals, such as hedgehogs and birds, whether they are threatened or not. Some of them can be saved, cared for, and released back into the wild. In addition, gamekeepers handle larger animals that exceed the museum's capabilities, such as deer and foxes.

== See also ==
- List of museums in Switzerland
