= Lake Geneva Museum =

- Musée du Léman
- Established: 1954
- Location: Nyon, Switzerland
- Coordinates: 46.380042°N 6.240102°E
- Visitors: 21,600 (2011)
- Public transit access: 15 minutes away from a train station.
- Website: museeduleman.ch

The Lake Geneva Museum (Musée du Léman) is located in Nyon, Switzerland. It was founded in 1954, and was created for the many artifacts found in the lake, such as shipwrecks, models, and engines. It also contains aquariums with images of wildlife.

== Surface ==
There are 1,000 square metres (11,000 sq ft) of permanent and temporary expositions, not taking into account administrative and technical premises, as well as a shelter for cultural assets and a depot for the museum collections.

== Visitors ==
In 2011, about 21,600 visitors. Аpproximately 700,000 since 1975.

== See also ==
- List of museums in Switzerland
