= List of museums in Switzerland =

This is a list of museums in Switzerland, sorted by canton and city / municipality. Included are Swiss natural history museums, science museums, transport museums, railway museums, military museums, art museums, ethnographic museums and chocolate museums, among others.

== Canton of Aargau ==
Aarau

- Aargauer Kunsthaus

Baden

- Museum Langmatt

Frick

- Dinosaur museum Frick

Full-Reuenthal

- Swiss Military Museum

Muri

- Museum Kloster Muri

== Canton of Appenzell-Ausserrhoden ==
Heiden

- Henry Dunant Museum

Teufen

- Null Stern Hotel

== Canton of Appenzell-Innerrhoden ==
Appenzell

- Appenzeller Alpenbitter

== Canton of Basel-Stadt ==
Basel

- Antikenmuseum Basel und Sammlung Ludwig
- Cartoonmuseum Basel – Centre for Narrative Art
- Dollhouse Museum
- Historical Museum Basel
- Jewish Museum of Switzerland
- Kunsthalle Basel
- Kunstmuseum Basel
- Museum of Contemporary Art
- Museum of Cultures
- Museum Tinguely
- Music Museum
- Natural History Museum of Basel
- Pharmacy Museum of the University of Basel
- Skulpturhalle Basel
- Swiss Architecture Museum
- Swiss Museum for Paper, Writing and Printing

== Canton of Basel-Landschaft ==
Augst

- Augusta Raurica

Münchenstein

- Frog Museum
- Watermill Museum Brüglingen

== Canton of Bern ==
Bern

Brienz

- Ballenberg

Burgdorf

- Museum Franz Gertsch

Courtelary

- Camille Bloch Discovery World

Thun

- Art museum Thun
- Panzermuseum Thun

== Canton of Fribourg ==
Bulle

- Musée gruérien

Broc

- Maison Cailler

Estavayer-le-Lac

- Museum of Estavayer-le-Lac

Fribourg

- Bible and Orient Museum
- Natural History Museum of Fribourg

Romont

- Romont Glass Museum

== Canton of Geneva ==
Geneva

- Barbier-Mueller Museum
- Centre d’Art Contemporain Genève
- Centre pour l’Image Contemporaine
- Geneva Botanical Garden
- Institut et Musée Voltaire
- International Red Cross and Red Crescent Museum
- MAMCO
- Musée Ariana
- Musée d'Art et d'Histoire
- Musée d'ethnographie de Genève
- Natural History Museum of Geneva
- Musée d'histoire des sciences de la Ville de Genève
- Musée Rath

Meyrin

- Microcosm (CERN)

== Canton of the Grisons ==
Bergün/Bravuogn

- Albula Railway Museum

Chur

- Bündner Kunstmuseum

Davos

- Kirchner Museum Davos

Sils-Maria

- Nietzsche-Haus

Susch

- Muzeum Susch

== Canton of Jura ==
Delémont

- Musée jurassien d'art et d'histoire

Develier

- Musée Chappuis-Fähndrich

== Canton of Lucerne ==
Kriens

- Museum im Bellpark

Lucerne

- Kunstmuseum Luzern
- Natur-Museum Luzern
- Richard Wagner Museum
- Rosengart Collection Museum
- Swiss Transport Museum

== Canton of Nidwalden ==
Hergiswil

- Glasi Hergiswil

== Canton of Neuchâtel ==
La Chaux-de-Fonds

- Musée International d'Horlogerie

Le Locle

- Musée d'Horlogerie du Locle
- Museum of Fine Arts Le Locle

Neuchâtel

- Laténium
- Musée d'Art et d'Histoire
- Musée d'ethnographie de Neuchâtel

== Canton of Schaffhausen ==
Schaffhausen

- Hallen für Neue Kunst (closed)
- Museum Stemmler
- Museum zu Allerheiligen

Stein am Rhein

- St. George's Abbey

== Canton of Schwyz ==
Schwyz

- Museum of the Swiss Charters of Confederation

== Canton of Solothurn ==
Solothurn

- Enter Museum
- Kościuszko Museum
- Kunstmuseum Solothurn

== Canton of St. Gallen ==
Degersheim

- Dreamfactory & World of Wonders

Flawil

- Maestrani's Chocolarium

Rapperswil-Jona

- Enea Tree Museum
- Polish Museum, Rapperswil
- Stadtmuseum Rapperswil

St. Gallen

- Kunstmuseum St. Gallen
- Textile Museum St. Gallen
- Natural History Museum in St. Gallen

St. Margrethen

- Fort Heldsberg

Wittenbach

- Dottenwil Castle

== Canton of Thurgau ==
Arbon

- Arbon Castle (Historic Museum Arbon)

Salenstein

- Arenenberg (Napoleon Museum)

== Canton of Ticino ==
Caslano

- Museo del Cioccolato Alprose

Lugano

- MASI Lugano
- Museum of Cultures (Lugano)
- Swiss Customs Museum

== Canton of Valais ==
Martigny

- Fondation Pierre Gianadda

Sierre

- Rainer Maria Rilke Foundation

Zermatt

- Matterhorn Museum

== Canton of Vaud ==
La Tour-de-Peilz

- Swiss Museum of Games

Lausanne

- Archizoom (EPFL)
- Cantonal Museum of Fine Arts
- Cantonal Museum of Zoology
- Collection de l'art brut
- Musée Bolo
- Musée et jardins botaniques cantonaux
- Museum of Contemporary Design and Applied Arts
- Olympic Museum
- Photo Élysée

Mies

- Racing Motorcycle Museum

Nyon

- Lake Geneva Museum

Sainte-Croix

- Musée d'automates et de boîtes à musique

Vevey

- Alimentarium
- Musée Jenisch

Yverdon-les-Bains

- Maison d'Ailleurs

== Canton of Zug ==
- Militärhistorische Stiftung des Kantons Zug

== Canton of Zurich ==
Dübendorf

- Flieger Flab Museum

Kilchberg

- Lindt Home of Chocolate

Küsnacht

- C. G. Jung House Museum

Niederweningen

- Mammutmuseum Niederweningen

Seegräben

- Aathal Dinosaur Museum

Winterthur

- Fotomuseum Winterthur
- Oskar Reinhart Collection "Am Römerholz"
- Oskar Reinhart Museum
- Kunstmuseum Winterthur
- Swiss Science Center Technorama

Zurich

- Ethnographic Museum of the University of Zurich
- FIFA Museum
- Foundation E.G. Bührle
- Haus Konstruktiv
- Kunsthaus Zürich
- Migros Museum of Contemporary Art
- MoneyMuseum
- Musée Visionnaire
- Museum of Design
- Natural History Museum of the University of Zurich
- No Show Museum
- North America Native Museum
- Pavillon Le Corbusier
- Rietberg Museum
- Swiss National Museum
- Uhrenmuseum Beyer
- Uhrenmuseum zum Rösli
- Zunfthaus zur Meisen
- Zurich Tram Museum

== See also ==
- List of botanical gardens in Switzerland
- List of castles and fortresses in Switzerland
- List of heritage railways and funiculars in Switzerland
- Lists of tourist attractions in Switzerland
- Long Night of Museums
