= Uhrenmuseum zum Rösli =

Horological museum in Zurich, Switzerland

Coordinates: 47°23′24″N 8°32′40″E

The Uhrenmuseum zum Rösli is a small horological museum in Zurich, Switzerland that was founded in 2006.

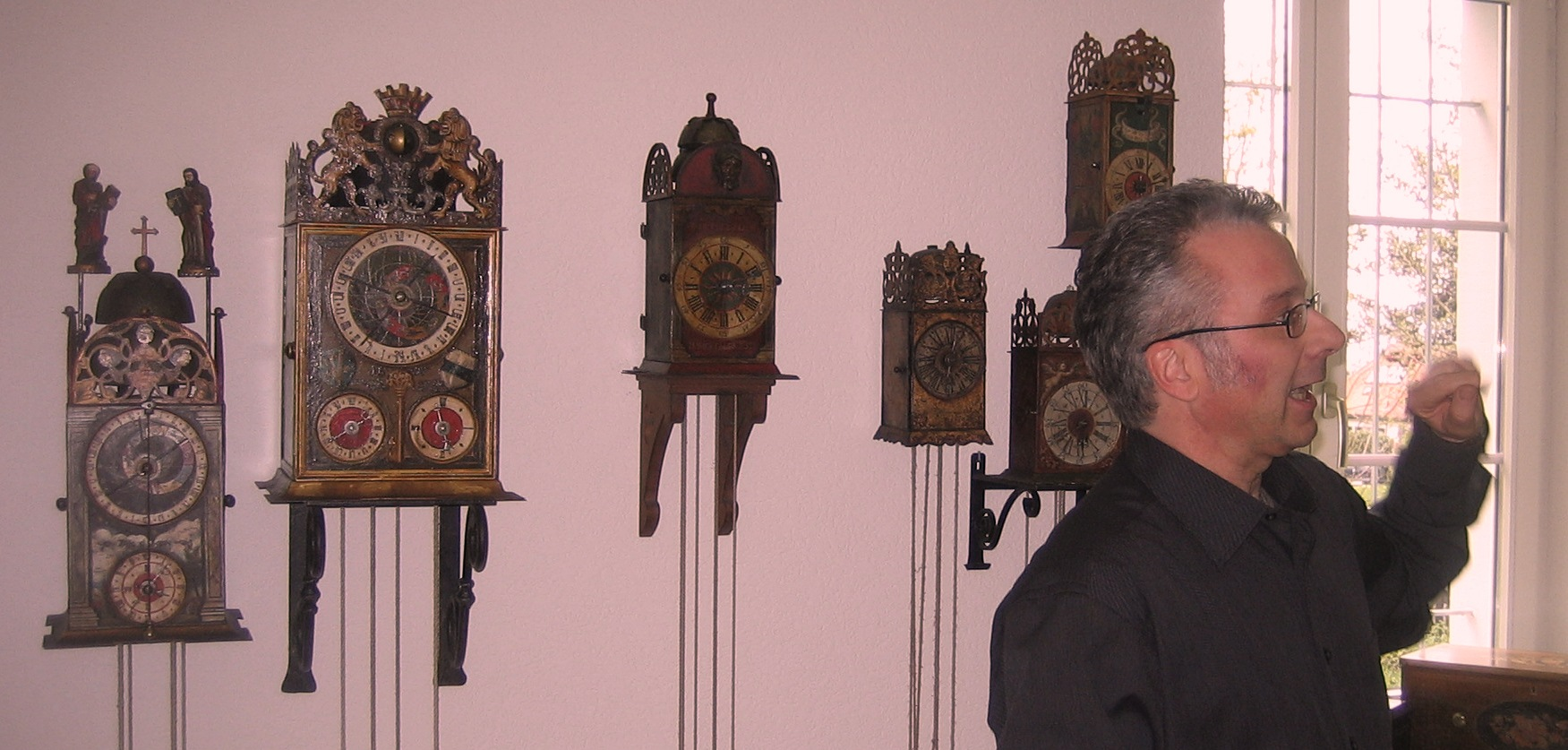
Uhrenmuseum zum Rösli: Several forged iron clocks from the gothic period, 16th century Switzerland and southern Germany

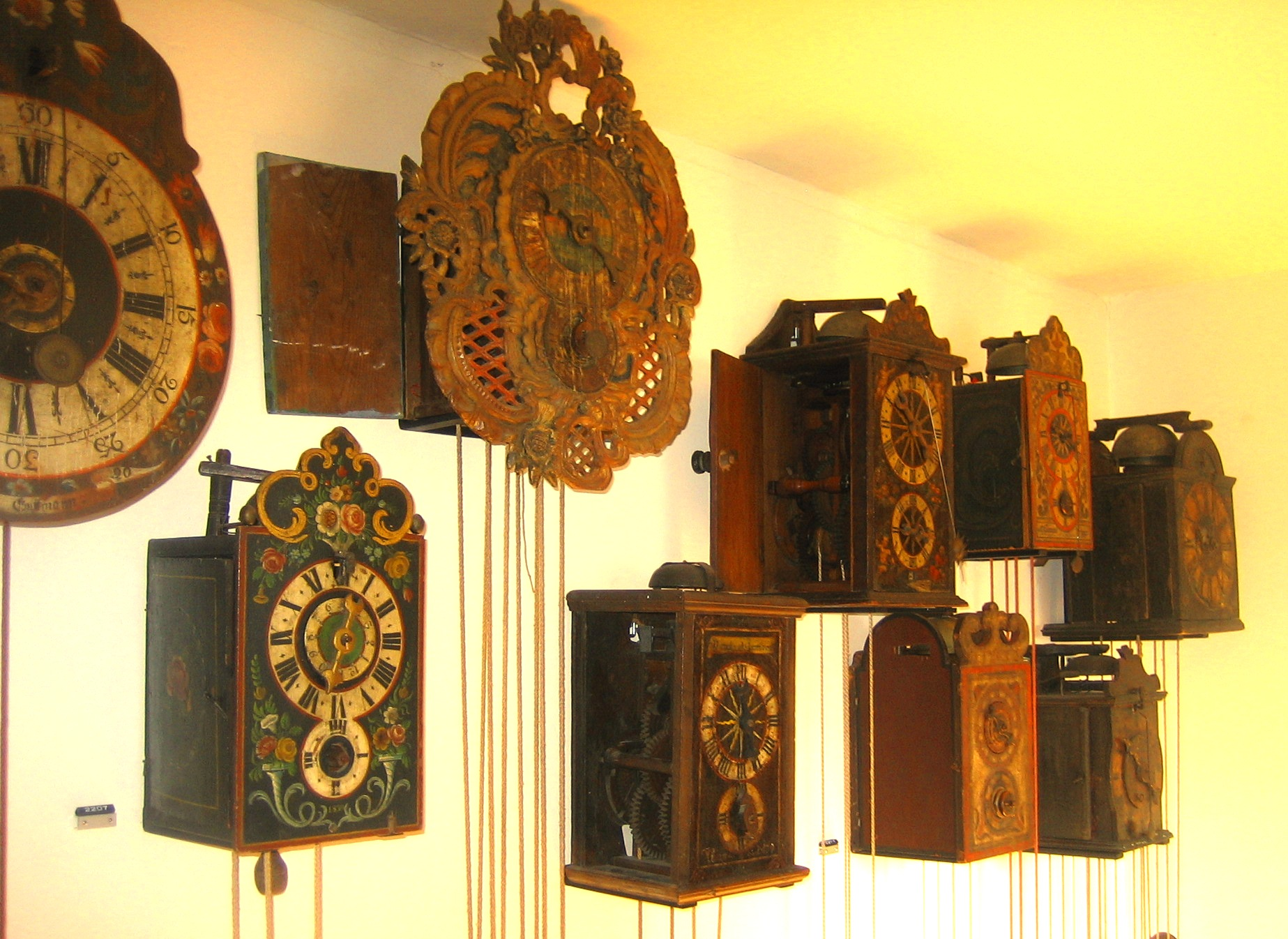
Uhrenmuseum zum Rösli: Several rustic, wooden movement clocks from the Davor, Toggenburg and Entlebuch region of Switzerland, mainly 19th century

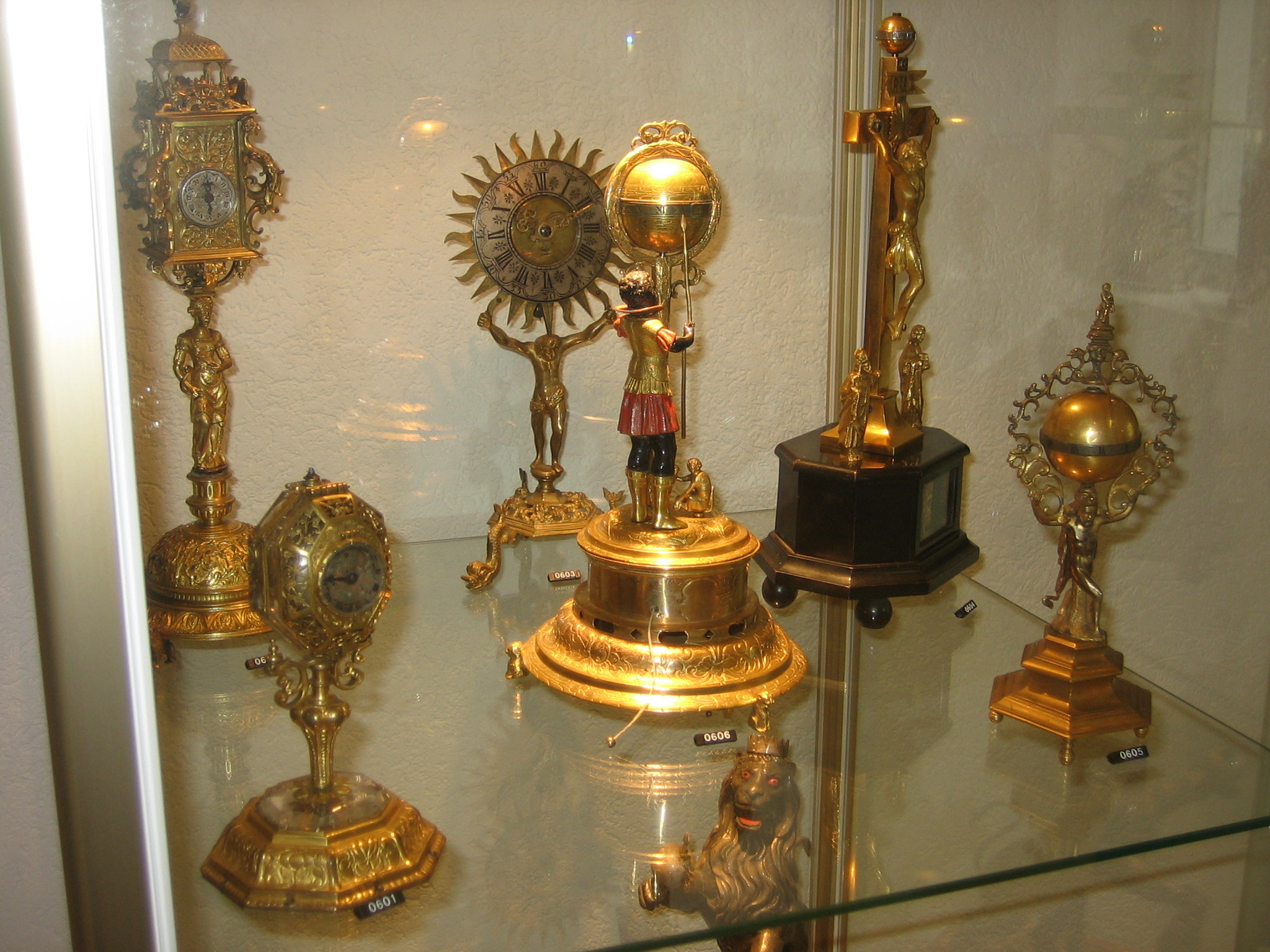
Uhrenmuseum zum Rösli: Several clocks from the renaissance period, Switzerland and southern Germany, 17th century

The museum is open by appointment and located in a historic building on Röslistrasse 46, about 3 kilometers north of the city center on the route to Oerlikon (Take Streetcar no. 7 to stop Röslistrasse).

== Collection ==
The collection focusses on clocks although there are a few watches as well. It is particularly rich in rustic clocks of Switzerland, mostly with wooden movements, and forged iron clocks of the Gothic period. There is a good collection of Renaissance timepieces and of Neuchatel type pendules as well. Altogether several hundred clocks are displayed.

== History ==
The building, constructed as a farmhouse in 1802, in 1856 became the local schoolhouse till 1887, when the teacher Johann Gisler bought it as his residence. His son Heinrich Gisler was a lifelong passionate collector of clocks, a tradition carried on by Heinrich's daughter Martha Gisler. Martha later befriended another local clock enthusiast named Hans Neufeld. The museum houses the clocks owned by the “Uhrenstiftung Martha Gisler & Hans Neufeld”.

== See also ==
- Other local horological museum: Uhrenmuseum Beyer
- Horology
- List of museums in Switzerland
