= Natur-Museum Luzern =

Museum in Lucerne, Switzerland

Coordinates: 47°03′06″N 8°18′04″E

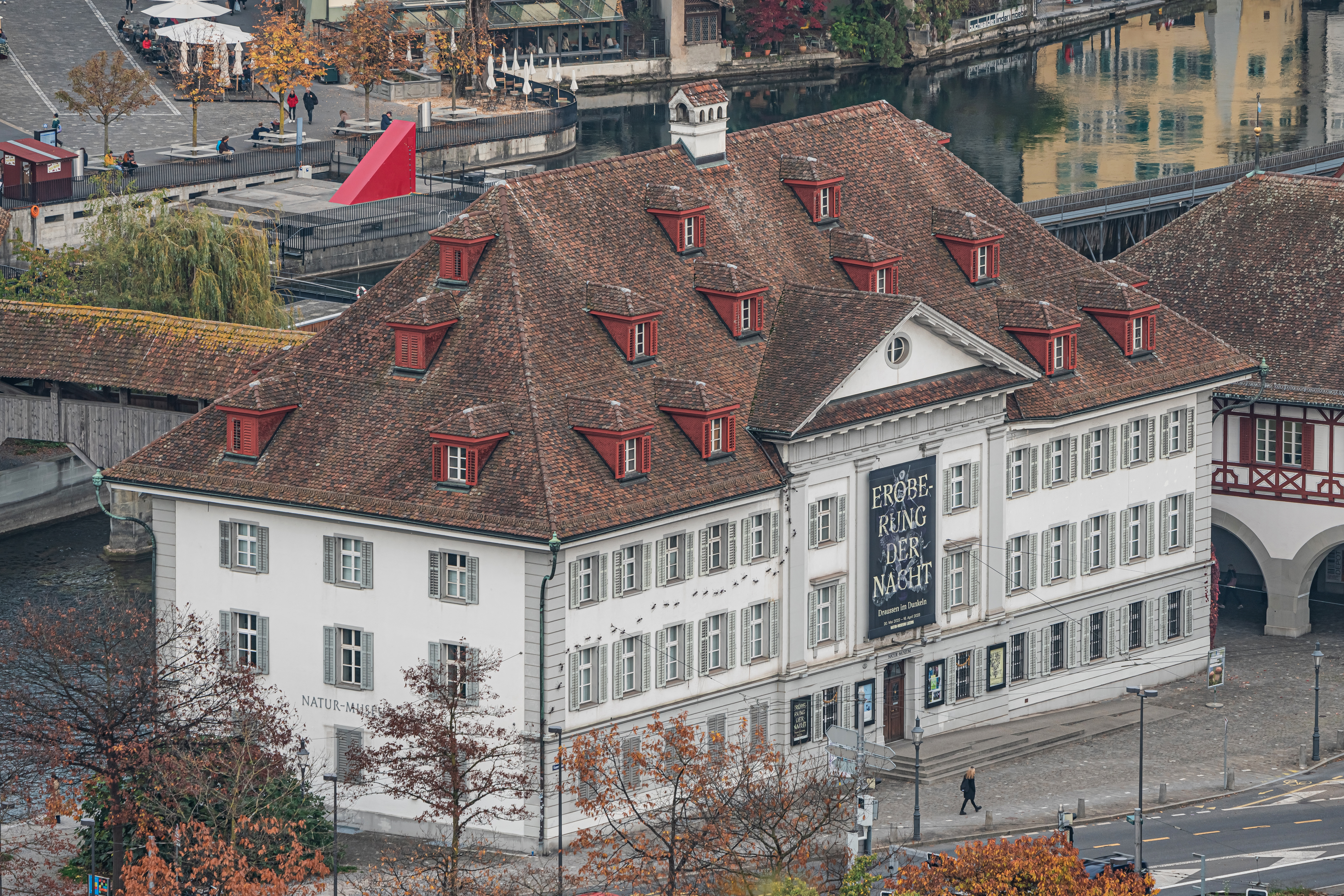
The museum in 2022

Natur-Museum Luzern or Lucerne Nature Museum is a museum in the Swiss city of Lucerne. It is situated on Kasernenplatz, beside the river Reuss and the Spreuerbrücke. Exhibits in the museum include stuffed animals, minerals/crystals, and insects. The museum is open Tuesday to Sunday and there is a fee for entry.

The stated goals of the museum translate as 'presenting natural history information to the public, maintaining and presenting collections and increasing awareness of nature and the environment'.

There are three floors and three permanent exhibitions: "Erdwissenschaften" (earth sciences), "Biologie" (biology) and "Wunderwelt Insekten" (the amazing world of insects).

Temporary exhibitions have included nature photography and live animals.

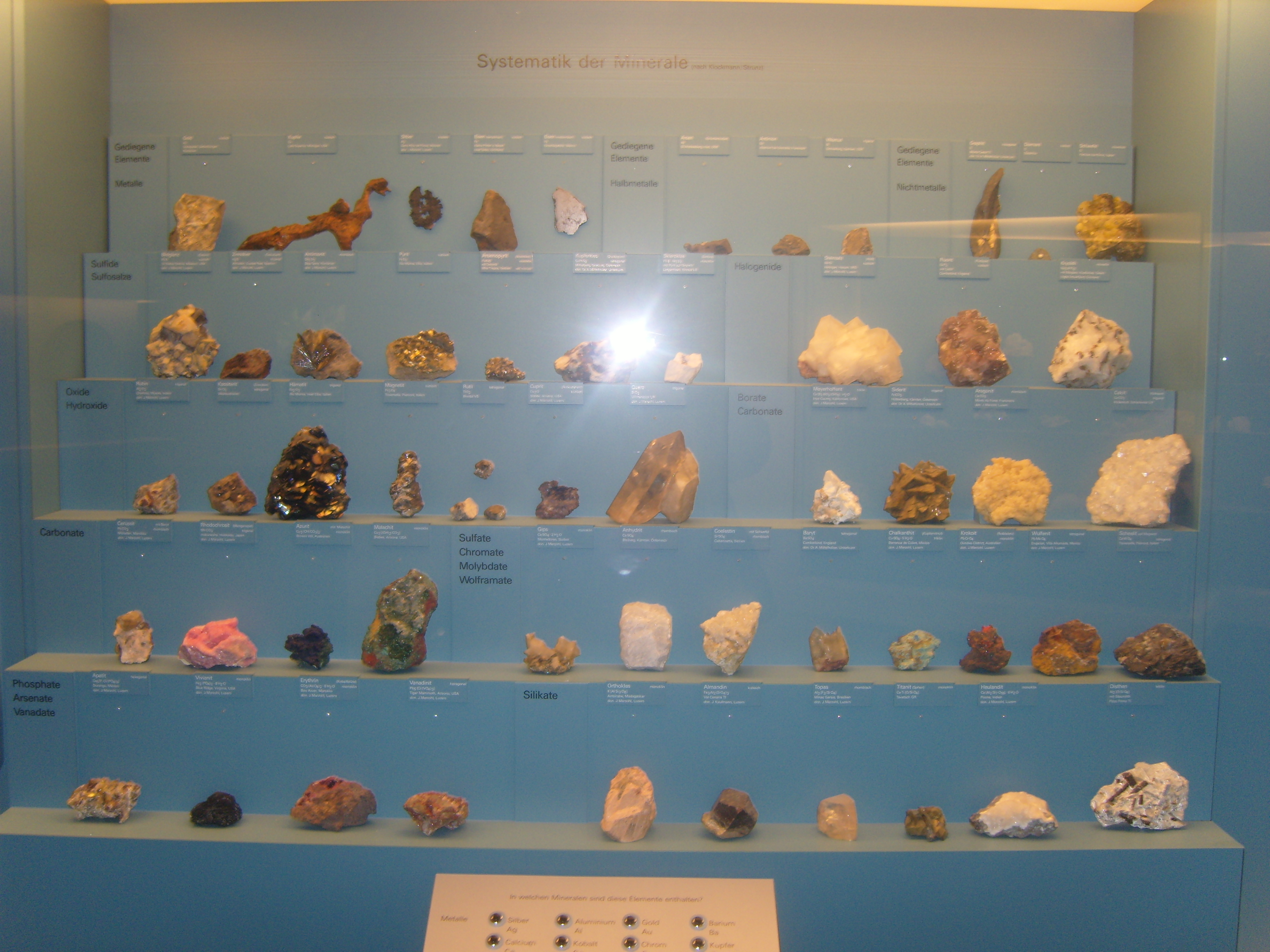
A geology exhibit from Natur-Museum Luzern in 2008

== History ==
There has been a natural history museum in Lucerne since the 18th Century. The original was established by Karl Nicolaus Lange and named Museum Lucernense Langianum. In either 1820 or 1825 the local Gymnasium school established a natural history museum, which was called Naturalien-Kabinett der höheren Lehranstalt. In 1848 the contents of another natural history collection from Kloster St. Urban were combined with the Museum Lucernense Langianum, and in 1849 so was the Naturalien-Kabinett der höheren Lehranstalt. In 1849 the combined collections were placed in a new museum building on Franziskanerplatz, when their former home was earmarked for demolition, to build a road. 1937 to 1976 the collection became spread across the cellars of the city. The building on Franziskanerplatz became occupied by the kantonalen Finanzverwaltung. The present museum building on Kasernenplatz was built in 1976, and opened in 1978.

== See also ==
- List of museums in Switzerland
