= Museum of Estavayer-le-Lac =

Coordinates: 46.8495°N 6.8487°E

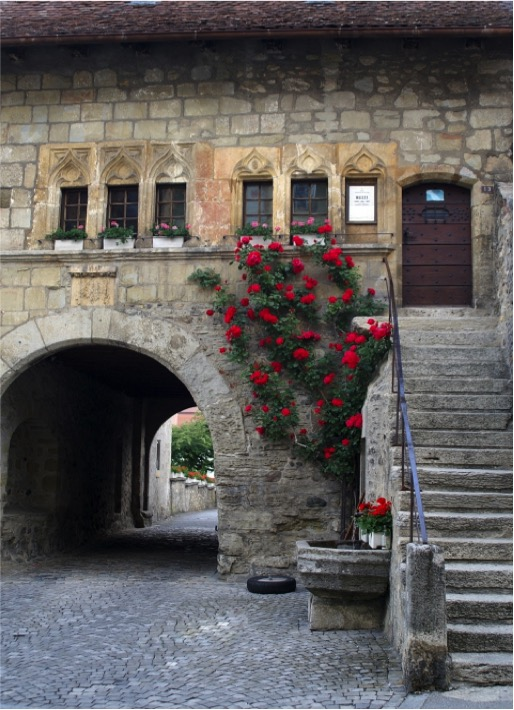
- Established: 1927
- Location: Estavayer-le-Lac
- Type: Regional Museum
- Website: https://www.museedesgrenouilles.ch

The Museum of Estavayer-le-Lac and its frogs is located in the town of Estavayer-le-Lac, in the canton of Fribourg, where it has occupied the Maison de la Dîme since 1927. This museum is also known as the "Frogs Museum" because of its collection of frogs, naturalized and arranged in scenes reproducing human attitudes.

== History ==
The Museum of Estavayer is a regional museum. It was built in a mansion from the 15th century. Most of the collections comes from donations from families in Estavayer or Fribourg, which highlights the culture and history of the region. Its nickname "Frog Museum" is due to its collection of 108 naturalized frogs. They take human poses and illustrate the daily life of the 19th century. The museum was initiated by a local association for the cultural development called Société de développement in 1900. The official inauguration, in its still current form as a municipal museum, took place on May 8, 1927. The museum has five rooms. Each has a thematic coherence: weapons, daily life, domestic life, natural history and farm life, and the frog collection. The museum also hosts temporary exhibitions.

== History of the building ==
The house in which the museum is situated was purchased in 1406 by Humbert the Bastard. He was the lord of Estavayer and the half-brother of Amedeus VIII, Duke of Savoy. The house was his home until his death in 1443. The street front has remained almost unchanged since 1408. The Humbert residential complex had several courtyards at the back, accessible by the passage under the museum. At that time, there were vegetable gardens, now converted into a public park. Before being transformed into a museum and opening its doors to the public in 1927, the house was used for various purposes such as a school and a grain attic. Despite a number of different functions, the house still has its original structure.

== Collections ==
=== Weapons ===
The Estavayer Museum has a large collection of weapons, some of which have been entrusted to the Museum by the inhabitants of Estavayer, while others come from abroad. Hubert de Boccard (1835-1908), a member of a noble family of the city and a traveller, donated most of this collection. Having served in the army, he became passionate about weapons, which he collected. The collection contains hast weapons, firearms, knives and other military equipment. The close border with France has brought foreign regiments to the region twice: the Bourbakis in the 1870s and the Spahis during the Second World War. Their traces, in the form of military objects and gifts, later became part of the museum.

=== Everyday objects ===
Most of these objects come from families of the region, who have donated them or bequeathed them to the museum. They belong to the worlds of crafts and domestic life. The tools mainly represent the wood, leather and metal trades. We find the private and family sphere with clothes and accessories, a kitchen reconstructed in the style of the 17th century or even spinning wheels. In addition, dozens of old locks and keys are also on display.

=== Paintings and maps ===
Many paintings decorate the walls of the exhibition. There are three main groups: historical personalities and family members of the region's upper middle class, the views of Estavayer and its surroundings, and religious representations.

=== Natural history ===
The museum also has a natural history collection consisting of a large number of naturalized birds from the Estavayer-le-Lac region, but also animals from other countries. A caiman is one of those more exotic animals. Insects are also exposed.

=== Frogs Collection ===
The most famous collection of the Estavayer Museum is the one that gives it its nickname "Frog Museum". The last room of the museum contains 108 naturalized frogs, installed in human postures. These productions date back to the middle of the 19th century and the mystery of their creation could never be completely solved. According to legend, they were made by François Perrier, a former junior officer in the Vatican. He sought to reproduce moments of Estavayer's daily life at that time. Batrachians are arranged for an election banquet, in a classroom, for a family dinner, or as soldiers on exercise. The frog collection arrived in the museum between the 1920s and 1930s. It was completely renovated between 2012 and 2015, and the room that houses it was redone for the occasion.

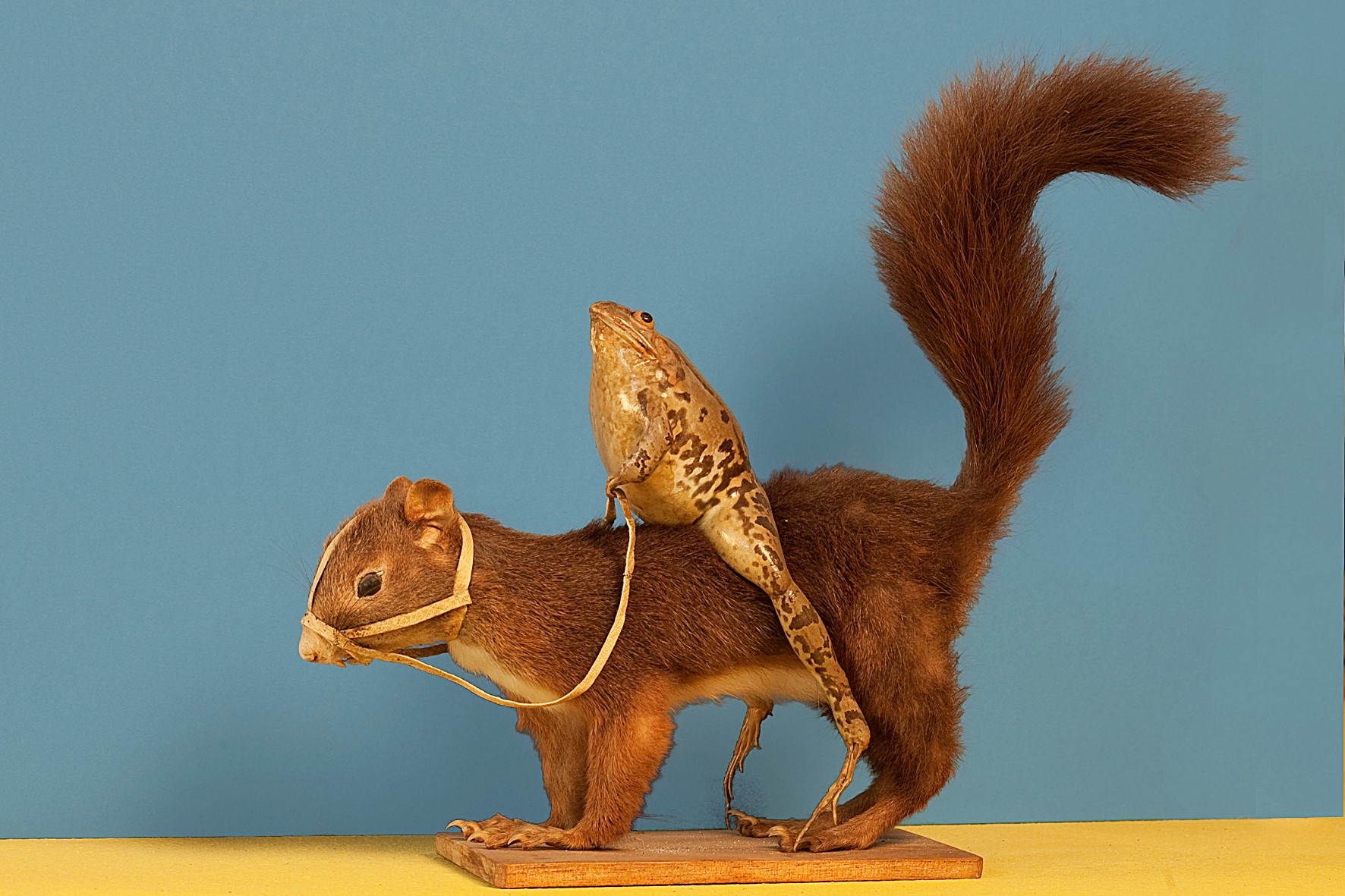
The rider

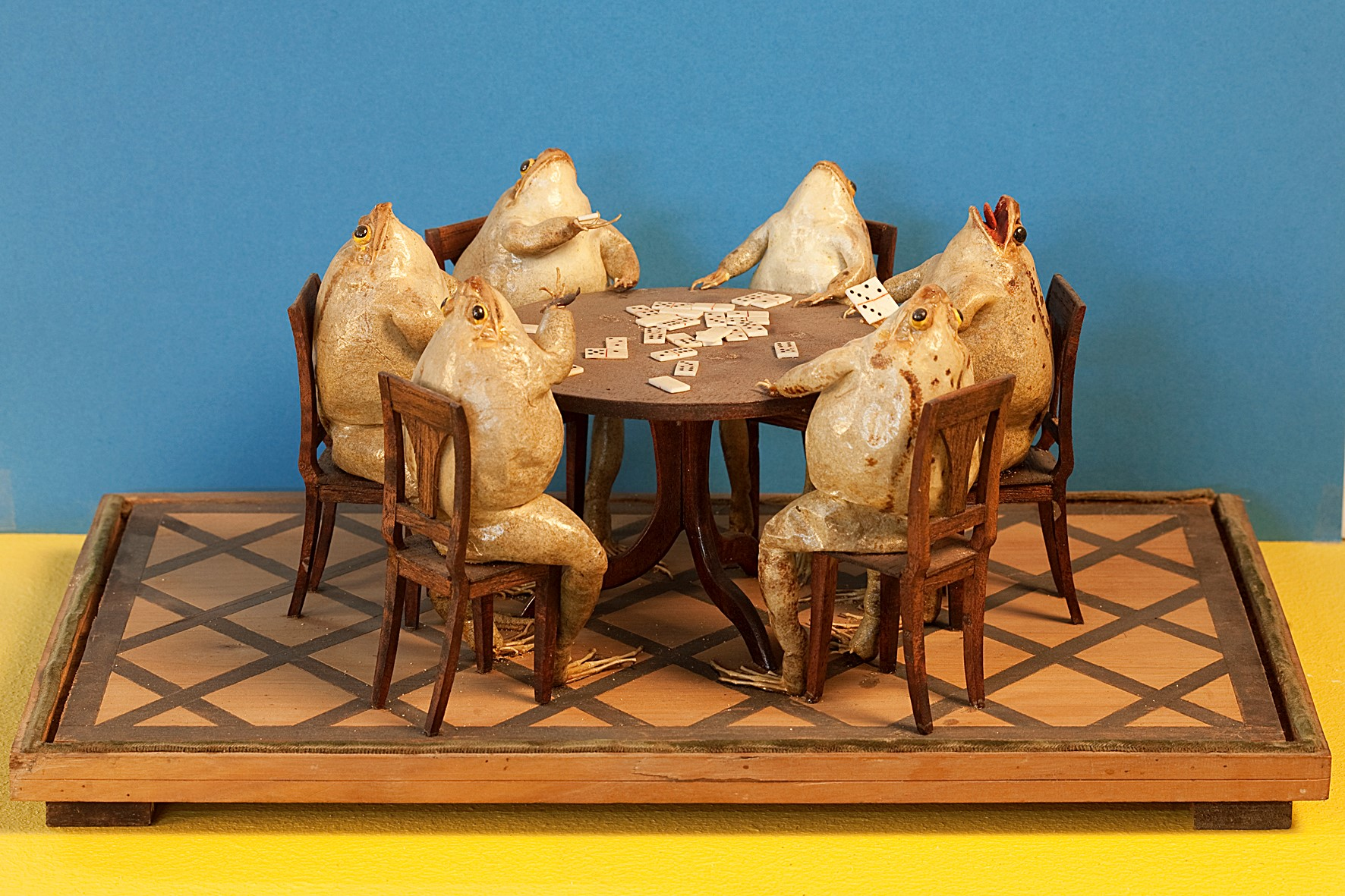
A game of dominos

== See also ==
- List of museums in Switzerland
