= Frog Museum (Münchenstein) =

Museum in Switzerland

Coordinates: 47°31′21″N 7°36′18″E

- Froschmuseum
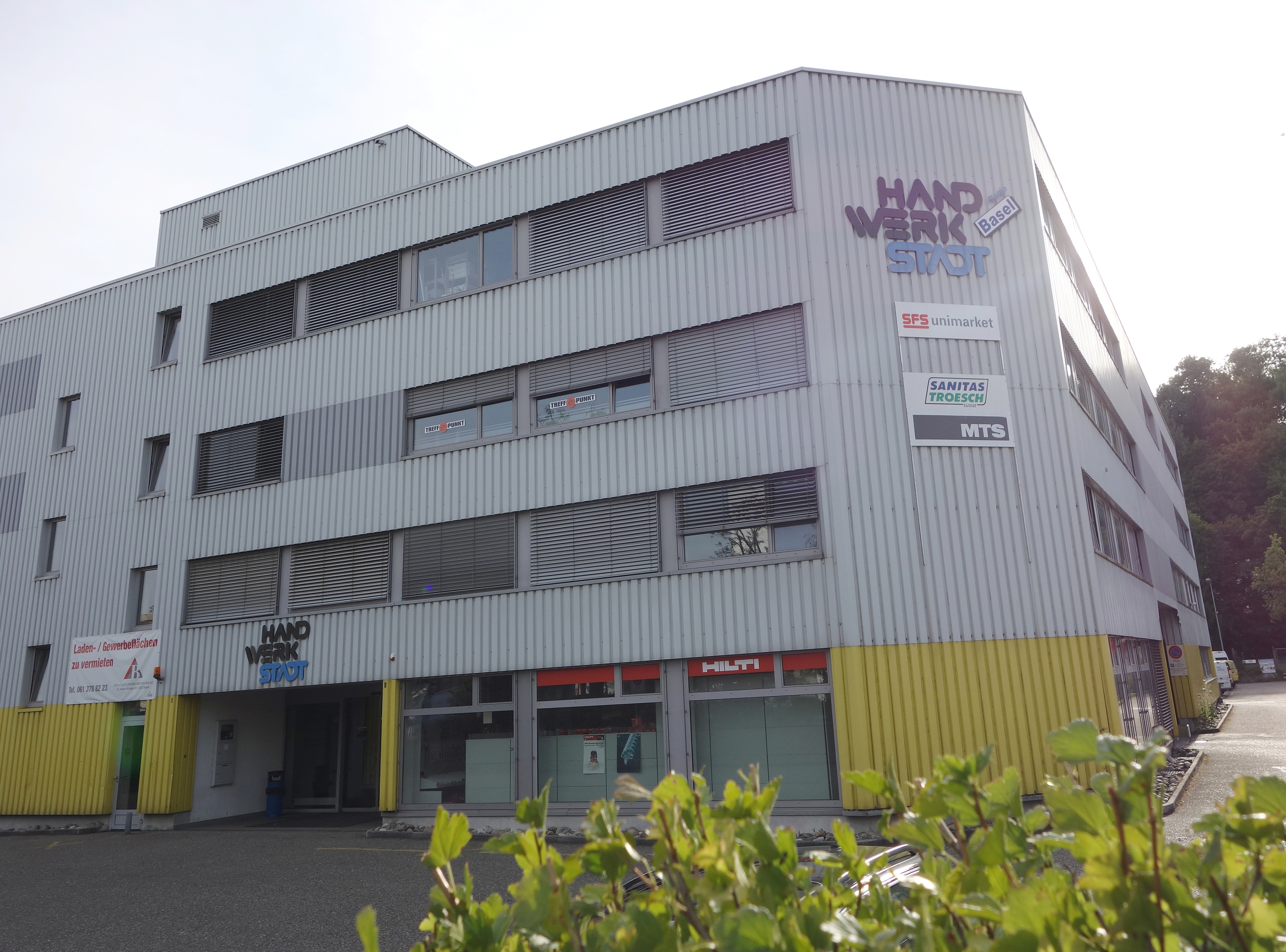
- Established: 1981; 45 years ago
- Location: Basel, Switzerland
- Founder: Elfi and Rolf Rindlisbacher
- Website: www.froggy.ch

The Frog Museum is in Newmünchenstein, a sub-district of Münchenstein, in the canton of Basel-Country in Switzerland. It is dedicated to frogs.

== History ==
The Frog Museum was privately founded in Basel in 1989 by Elfi and Rolf Rindlisbacher with about 3200 exhibits. However, the couple had been collecting since 1981, with newspaper articles about their collection, already at 500 items, published in 1982.

The museum displays frog figurines made of a variety of materials, including wood, porcelain, glass, ceramic, brass, and chocolate. The frog memorabilia displayed also includes a large variety of objects, including jugs, lamps, jewellery, key rings, mugs, ornaments, telephones, radios, among others.

In 1992 the museum moved from Basel to Münchenstein with 5000 frog objects and installed a modern and larger museum (100 m^{2}) in the building of the Handwerkstadt, a commercial centre for craft works. In 1993 the collection had grown so big that it was rewarded with an inclusion in Guinness World Records. Since then, the record has been claimed by a British woman, named Sheila Crown, who gained the record in 2002. In 1994 the museum was enlarged again (150 m^{2}).

By 2007, there had been over 24,000 visitors to the museum.

In 2009 and 2010, there was significant water damage to the museum. No frogs were damaged, but shelves and exhibit cases had to be removed and replaced.

The Frog Museum now has more than 15,000 exhibits of different shapes, sizes, and materials.

== See also ==
- List of museums in Switzerland
