= Musée Chappuis-Fähndrich =

Coordinates: 47.353°N 7.292°E

The Musée Chappuis-Fähndrich, located in Develier, Canton of Jura, Switzerland, houses a large collection of objects from everyday life in the region during the period 1650 to 1950.

The collection, assembled by Marc Chappuis and his wife, and housed in a barn, consists of housewares, farm tools, devotional items, and other objects used in farm life, local crafts, and religious worship over a period of three hundred years. There are cast iron skillets, ceramic pots, wooden toys, and leather harnesses, many of them purchases from local second hand shops or gifts of nearby farmers.

The museum is private and open by appointment only.

== See also ==
- List of museums in Switzerland
