= Musée Visionnaire =

Museum in Switzerland

Coordinates: 47.37395054°N 8.5482948°E

Musée Visionnaire is a private museum dedicated to outsider art located in Zurich, Switzerland. It was founded on 18 November 2013. The Musée Visionnaire is a non-profit association.

It is an art foyer in which changing exhibitions allow visitors to discover and re-discover contemporary outsider art and experience it within the context of related art forms. Special social events are dedicated to topical subjects touching upon the world of art and current public issues.

== See also ==
- American Visionary Art Museum
- Collection de l'art brut
- List of museums in Switzerland
