= Musée gruérien =

Coordinates: 46°37′00″N 7°03′31″E

The Musée gruérien is a museum located in Bulle, Switzerland which is dedicated to the ethnography and history of the Gruyère District of the Canton of Fribourg, Switzerland. The museum was opened in 1917.

== History ==
The museum was opened in 1917. Upon his death, Victor Tissot, a local artist and journalist, left his estate to the town of Bulle with the intention that it be used to create a museum and library. The museum was opened in 1917, with Philippe Aebischer as the first curator. Between 1923 and 1978 the museum was housed in the Hôtel Moderne in Bulle, before being moved to its current purpose-built building in 1978. This building was then extended in 2001, before being renovated in 2012.

The museum closed for refurbishment in 2025, and is due to reopen at the end of 2027.

== Collections ==
The collection is dedicated to the histsory of the Gruyère District, especially the folk art of the region and preservation of regional traditions, as well as the social and economic history. The collection consists of over 25,000 objects and includes prints, drawings, paintings, sculpture, textiles, traditional tools, woodwork, ceramics, furniture, photographs. On display are a number of dioramas of the town showing how it has changed across time - with the models showing Bulle in 1722, 1912 and 2002. In addition, the museum houses a library which holds a large number of items, including photographs, documenting the history of Bulle.

== See also ==
- List of museums in Switzerland
