= Bible and Orient Museum =

Coordinates: 46°48′23″N 7°09′10″E

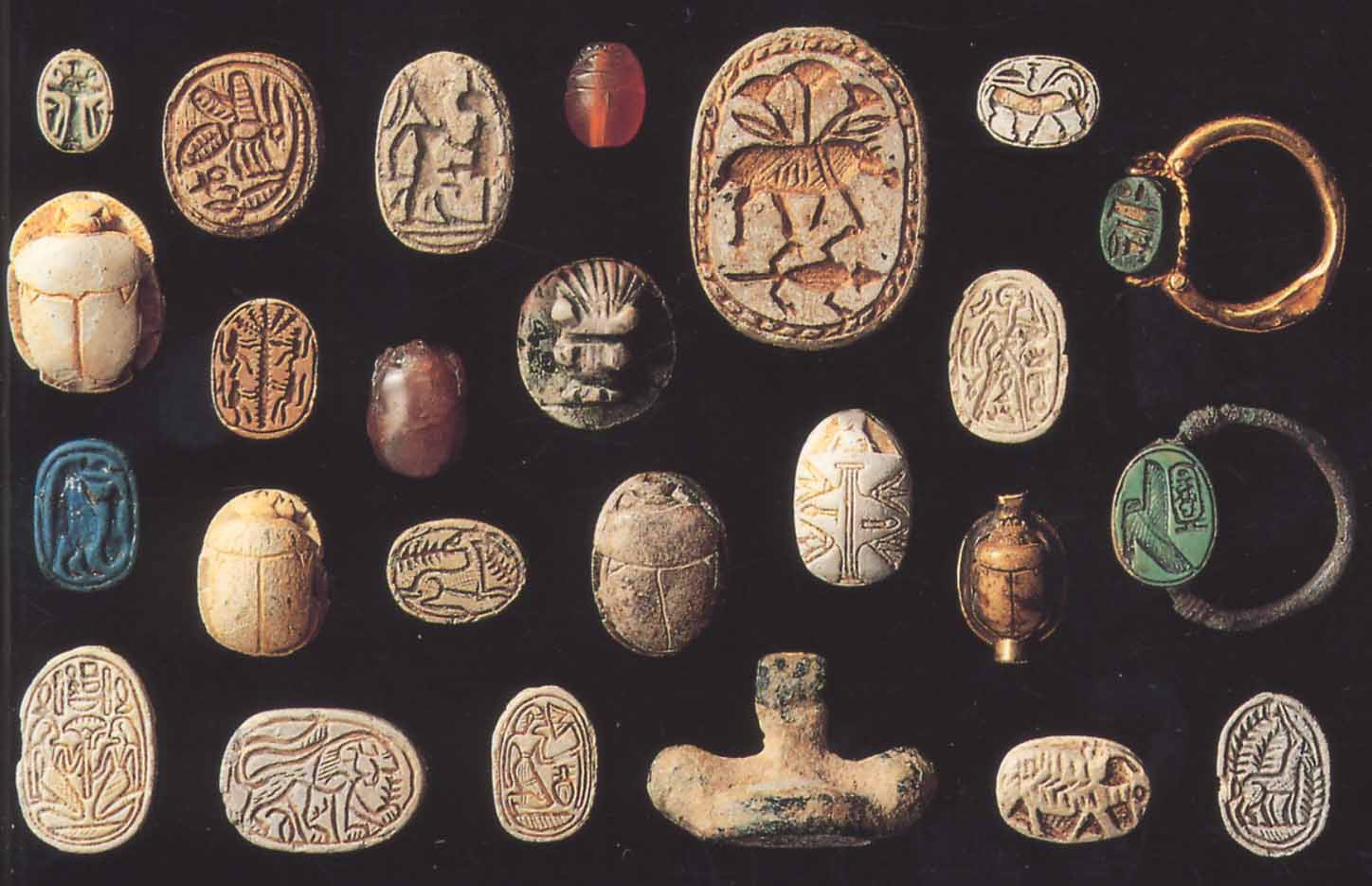
Miniature art from the Old Orient

The Bible and Orient Museum (French: Musée Bible et Orient), stylised BIBLE+ORIENT Museum and located in Fribourg, Switzerland, is the exhibition of a collection of ancient Egyptian and ancient Near Eastern miniature art, as well as a project to create a modern museum to compare biblical and extra-biblical texts with archaeological, epigraphical and iconographical data. This comparison is aimed at offering stimulating insights for the advancement of the interreligious dialog.

== Responsible body ==
The Swiss Canton of Fribourg, the University of Fribourg and the promoters association «project BIBLE+ORIENT» created the foundation BIBEL+ORIENT in 2005 for the purpose of valorizing and expanding the collection with the aim of its efficient publication and the future construction and operation of a Bible and Orient Museum.

== Formation and purpose ==
Already as a student, the biblical, religious science and Egyptology professor Othmar Keel collected miniature image carriers such as Cylinder seals, scarabs and amulets on his trips to the region of Southwestern Asia and the ancient Near East. Five to three thousand years ago, this “miniature art”, which could easily be carried over long distances, distributed – as a sort of mass communication – important motives and symbols. At that time it represented important symbols of protection and power and today it reveals the close bonds of the Bible with its ancient Near Eastern surroundings. Keel observed that without knowledge of these symbols, many biblical comparisons, symbols and visions cannot be properly understood and thereby demonstrated the general importance of ancient Near Eastern cultural history for biblical science.

By interpreting biblical texts in their historical context, a fundamentalist-literal understanding of the Bible can be avoided. Furthermore, this approach shows the relations between Islam and Judaism, between Christianity and Judaism, between Judaism and ancient Near Eastern Paganism, and thereby relativizes the claim to absolute truth by the monotheist religions.

Subsequently, Keel and his colleagues successfully collected more of these precious objects. The midterm goal is to erect an adequate museum with the aim of transmitting knowledge in new ways.

=== Today’s collection ===
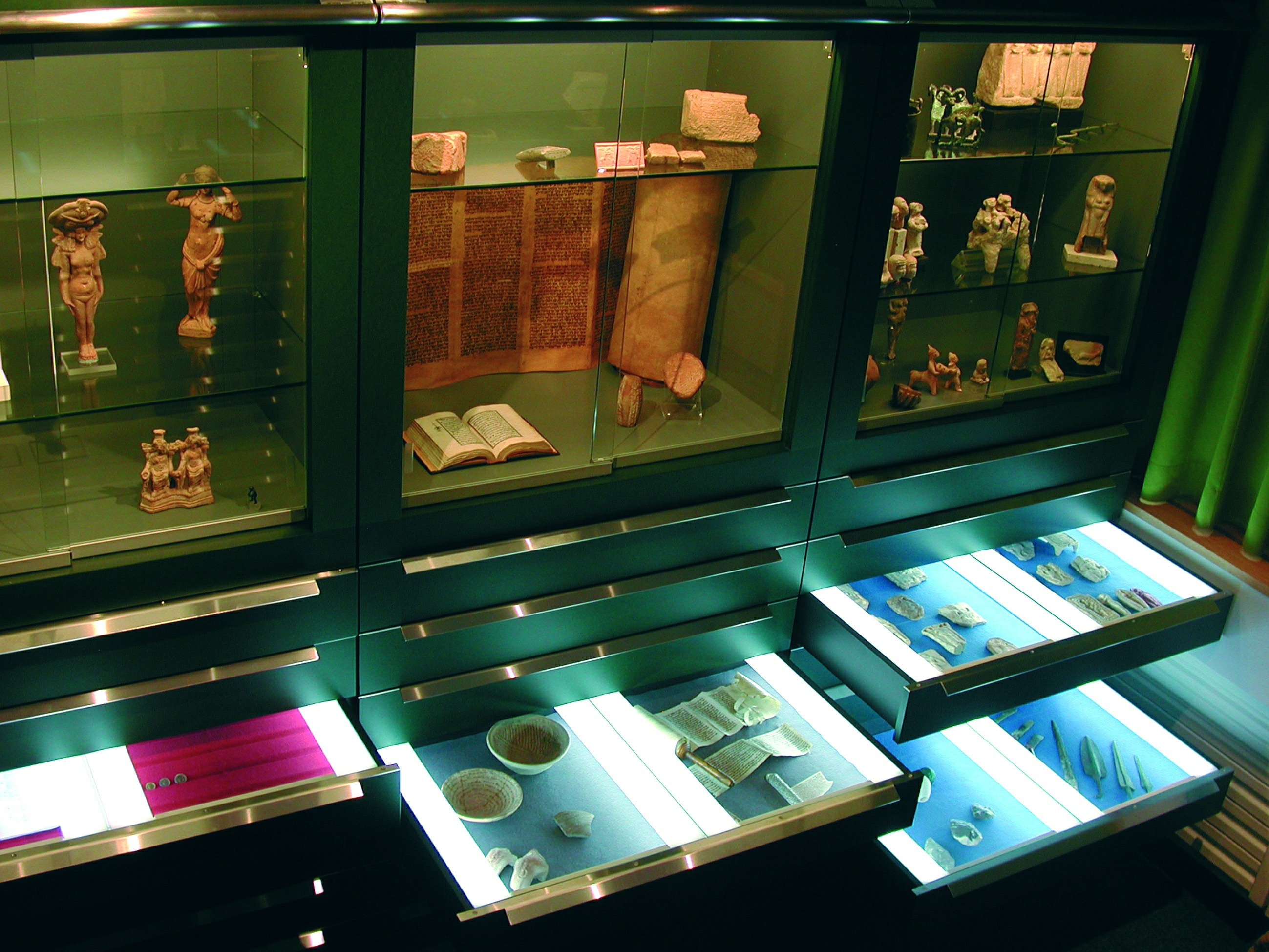
Today’s collection of the Museum

Since 1975, considerable donations have allowed the acquisition of over 15.000 unique items from the ancient Near East. Many of them are exposed in a permanent exhibition with 57 extendable, illuminated drawers and 6 showcases, offering a significant insight into the world of the ancient Near East, out of which the Bible emerged.

Among them are Early Paleolithic fist wedges from Syria; Near Eastern, particularly Akkadian, Old-Babylonian, Old Syrian, Mitanni and New Assyrian cylinder seals; Near Eastern, prehistoric and Iron Age stamp seals; Near Eastern terra cotta, idols, amulets, etc.; Cuneiform script boards, from Old Akkadian to Persian, partly with cylinder seal impressions; Palestinian vessels, partly from the excavations on the Tel Kinneret (Israel); scarabs and similar Egyptian and Egypt-like seal amulets (worldwide the third largest collection of its kind); blank scarabs and scarab amulets; Egyptian amulets and bronzes; Egyptian amulet forms; Ancient Egyptian steles, bronzes and reliefs; clay tablets; tools; weapons; ceramics; manuscripts of biblical texts; Torah and Esther roles; a Samaritan Pentateuch; editions of the Koran; coins; lamps; Palestinian ethnologica.

=== Special exhibitions ===
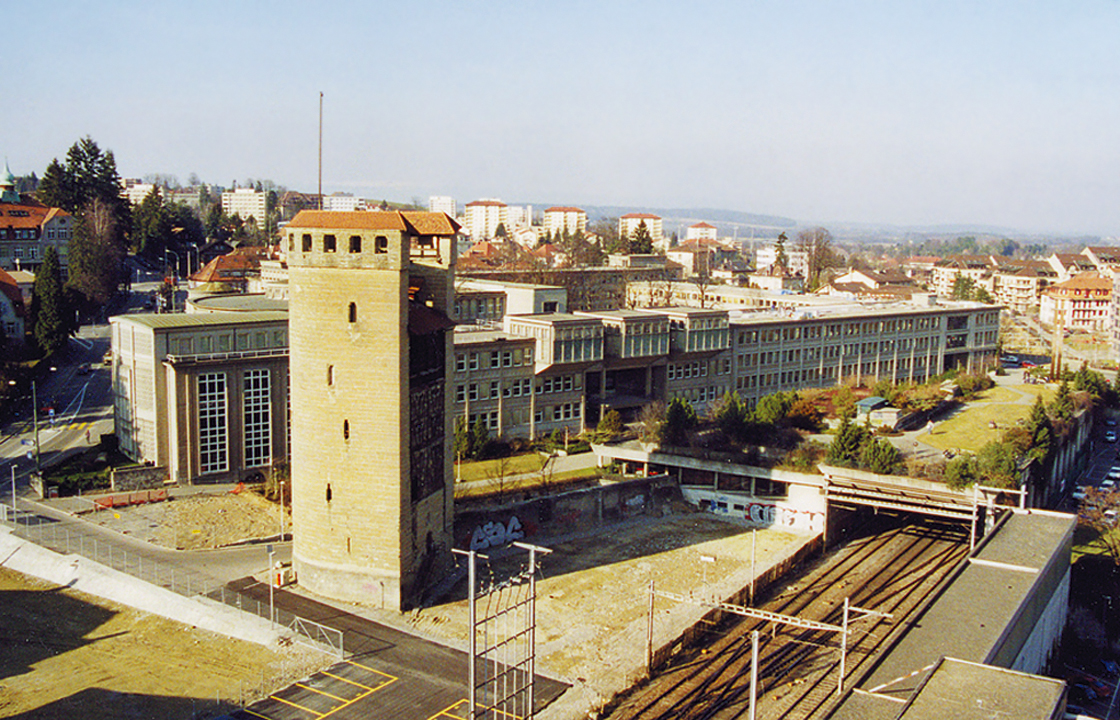
Henry Tower

In the past years, the following special exhibitions were conceived and realized with considerable success in Switzerland and Germany, using parts of the collection and interpretations thereof: Animals in the Bible, Publicity for the Gods, Solomon's Temple , God as a woman, Vertical Ecumenism.

== Project for the Museum ==
Between the train station and the University of Fribourg stands a 33 meter high defense tower constructed in 1415, which has been unused for decades. In 1998 the canton of Fribourg bought the area containing this so-called Henry Tower. A feasibility study was carried out in order to assess the possibility of installing the museum in this tower and on the adjacent area.

== See also ==
- List of museums in Switzerland
