= Museum im Bellpark =

Museum in Kriens, Switzerland

Coordinates: 47.034538°N 8.282893°E

The Museum im Bellpark is a forum for photography, history, and art in Kriens, Switzerland. It has existed since 1991.

The Museum maintains an archive that documents the development of Kriens from a village to an conurbation, and is building up a collection of Swiss drawings. Its focus is on photography, and it regularly organizes exhibitions. The Museum is supported by the Museum im Bellpark association.

== Photographic archive ==
The Museum im Bellpark maintains an archive with photographs by various photographers from Kriens:

- Emil Kreis, (1895–1925), architectural photography, object photography, industrial photography
- Franz Schütz, (1940––1980), documentation of Kriens, architectural photography
- Otto Pfeifer, (1935–1990), architectural photography, industrial photography, portrait photography
- Heinz Schwarz, (1970 to date), Kriens documentation, architectural photography, documentary photography
- Mario Kunz, (1985 to date), cityscapes of Kriens, architectural photography, object photography

== Publications ==
- Slopes & Houses, Georg Aerni, 2002, Museum im Bellpark, Eikon
- Fabrik und Atelier. Menschen und Dinge, Emil Kreis, 2000, Museum im Bellpark, Kriens
- Waldhüttenbilder. Kinderhüttentext, 2000, Museum im Bellpark, Kriens
- Krienser Ansichten, photographed by Heinz Schwarz, 1999, Museum im Bellpark, Kriens
- Fotografien, Otto Pfeifer, Museum im Bellpark, Kriens, 1998
- Kriens in alten Ansichten, Museum im Bellpark, Kriens, 1991

== See also ==
- List of museums in Switzerland
