= Henry Dunant Museum =

Biographical museum in Switzerland

Coordinates: 47.443368°N 9.531266°E

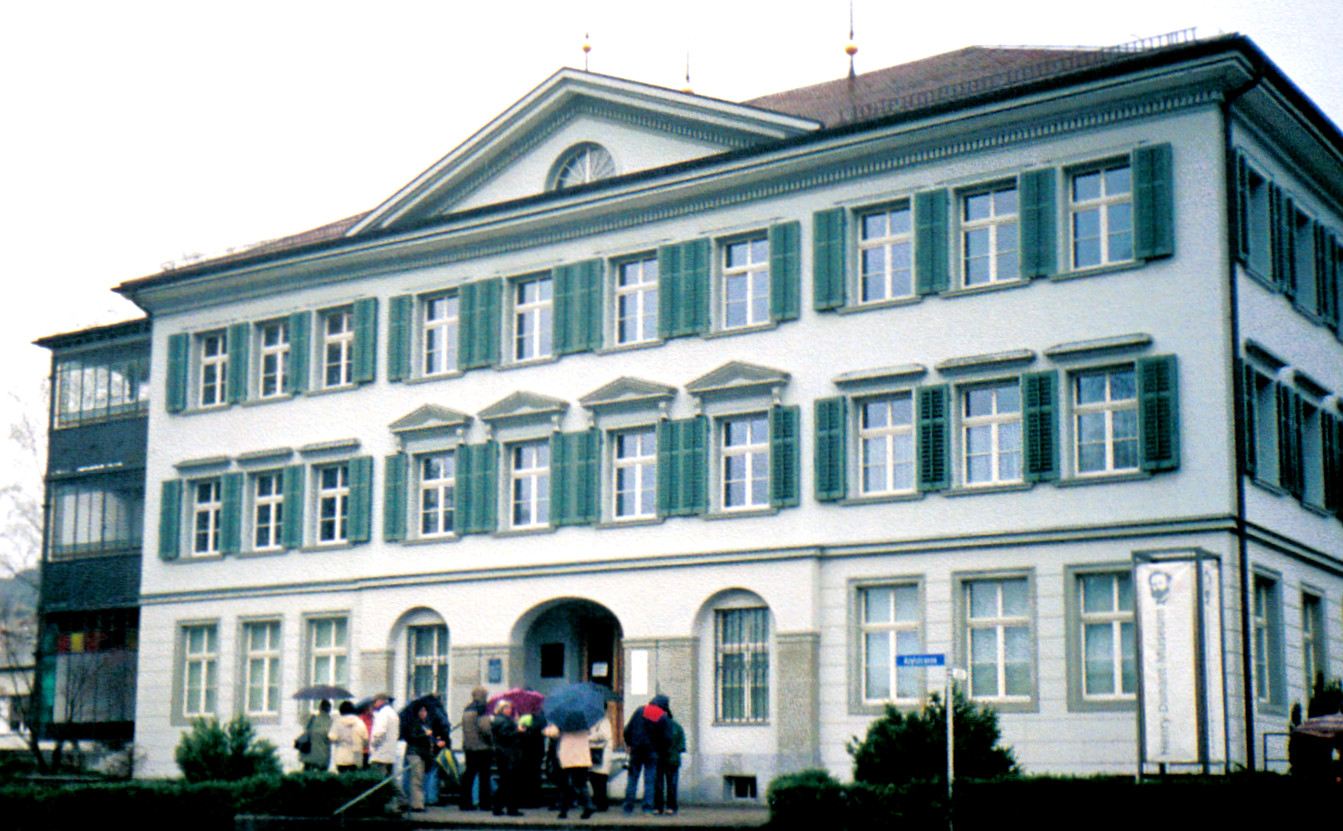
Henry Dunant Museum

The Henry Dunant Museum is a biographical museum in the Swiss town of Heiden. It is dedicated to preserve the memory and legacy of Henry Dunant, the founder of the Red Cross Movement, who died in Heiden in 1910, after receiving the first-ever Nobel Prize for Peace in 1901.

The Museum is situated in the nursing home where he lived from 1892 until his death.

== See also ==
- List of museums in Switzerland
