= MoneyMuseum (Zurich) =

Coordinates: 47.38882°N 8.55157°E

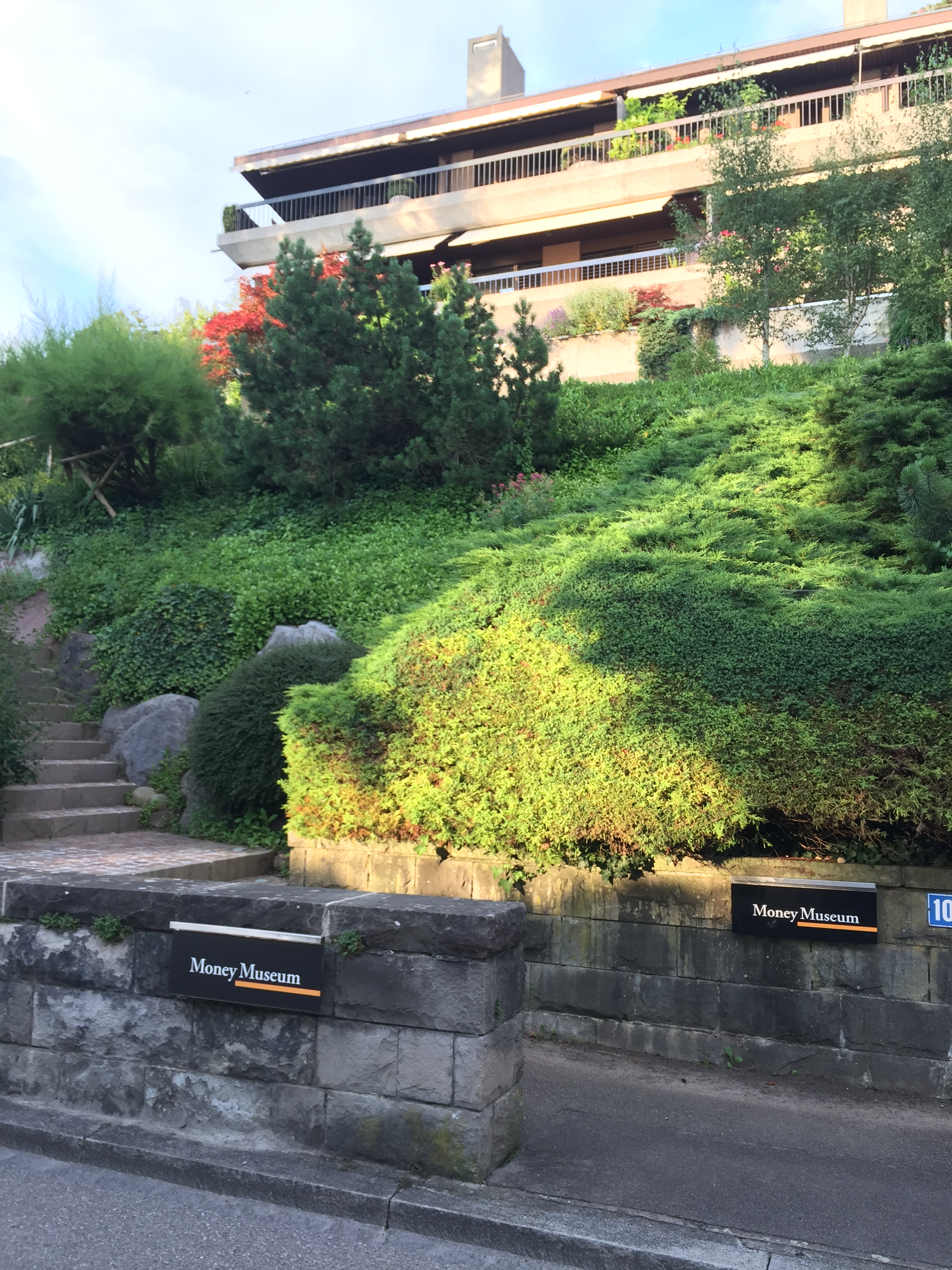
MoneyMuseum

MoneyMuseum is a private museum in Zurich, Switzerland, that focuses critically on monetary history and the future of money. It is funded by the nonprofit Sunflower Foundation.

== History ==
Financial analyst Jürg Conzett founded the MoneyMuseum in 1999. He assigned his private collection to the Sunflower Foundation, which he created as the umbrella organization of the MoneyMuseum. It was the world’s first numismatic museum.

In October 2000, the MoneyMuseum opened a branch in the Swiss National Museum. In 2002, it opened a permanent exhibit in the Museum Bärengasse. That was also the venue of the highly regarded exhibition 'The People of Zürich and their Money' which highlighted the ways people make use of money. In February 2003, the MoneyMuseum opened a 500-square-meter (5,400 sq ft) facility at Hadlaubstrasse 106. Since then, the permanent exhibition is regularly supplemented by special presentations and events.

The MoneyMuseum aims to "the visitor aware of the historical, economic and social background of the individual objects, thus making him reflect about his own use of money."

== Online ==
The MoneyMuseum offers free material on the Internet. Materials include are works on the history of money as well as ‘Money:critical’ where economic theorists deal with current aspects of money. As of 2016, the MoneyMuseum placed a new focus on 'Crisis'.

== See also ==
- List of museums in Switzerland
