= Museum of Chocolate =

Museum of Chocolate or Chocolate Museum may refer to:

- Museum of cacao and chocolate, Brussels
- Chocolate Museum (New Brunswick), Canada
- Chocolala Chocolate Museum, Tallinn, Estonia
- Musée du chocolat, Fécamp, Normandy, France
- Schokoladenmuseum Köln (Chocolate Museum Cologne), Germany
- Halloren Schokoladenmuseum (Halloren Chocolate Museum), at Halloren Chocolate Factory in Halle, Saxony-Anhalt, Germany
- Museum of Chocolate (Pokrov), Russia
- A museum in Astorga, Spain
- Museu de la Xocolata, El Born, Ciudad Vieja, Spain
- Hungya Chocolate Museum, Taiwan
- Finney's Cafeteria, also known as the Museum of Chocolate, Los Angeles, California, United States

== See also ==
- Musée "Les secrets du chocolat" in Geispolsheim, France
- List of chocolate museums
- Choco-Story (disambiguation)
