= List of chocolate museums =

A chocolate museum is any museum covering the subject of chocolate. Below is a list of chocolate museums.

Name	Town / City	Country	Notes
Schokomuseum Wien	Vienna	Austria	
Belgian Chocolate Village	Brussels	Belgium	
Chocolate Nation	Antwerp	Belgium	
Choco-Story Bruges	Bruges	Belgium	
Choco-Story Brussels	Brussels	Belgium	
Musée de chocolat Jacques	Eupen	Belgium	
Chocolate Caseiro Prawer	Gramado	Brazil	
The Chocolate Museum (Canada)	St. Stephen	Canada	
Couleur Chocolat	Sainte-Anne-des-Monts	Canada	
Musée du chocolat de la confiserie Bromont	Bromont	Canada	
Chocolate Museum Zagreb	Zagreb	Croatia	The Chocolate Museum Zagreb explores the history of chocolate showcasing hundreds of historic artefacts accompanied by tasting of nine varieties of chocolate.
The Chocolate Museum (Cuba)	Havana	Cuba	
Choco-Story Prague	Prague	Czech Republic	
Kalev Chocolate Museum	Tallinn	Estonia	
Chocolala Chocolate Museum	Tallinn	Estonia	History of the Estonian chocolate making industry since 1806
Cadbury World	Birmingham	England	
Walker's Chocolate Emporium Museum	Devon	England	
The Chocolate Museum (London)	Brixton, London	England	
York's Chocolate Story	York	England	
Chocolaterie Drakkar	Nonant	France	
Chocolaterium	Damville	France	
Le Paradis du Chocolat	La Côte-Saint-André	France	Jouvenal House chocolate
Musée du Chocolat Bovetti	Terrasson-Lavilledieu	France	
Musée du Chocolat Des Hautot	Fécamp	France	
Musée du Chocolat Des Lis Chocolat	Nemours	France	
Musée "Les secrets du chocolat"	Geispolsheim	France	Marquise de Sévigné brand
Planete Musée du Chocolat	Biarritz	France	
Chocoversum	Hamburg	Germany	
Imhoff-Schokoladenmuseum	Cologne	Germany	
Halloren Schokoladenmuseum	Halle	Germany	
Rausch SchokoLand	Peine	Germany	
Ritter Sport ChocoExhibition	Waldenbuch	Germany	Ritter Sport brand
Wawi Schoko-Welt	Pirmasens	Germany	WAWI, Nappo and Moritz brands
Csokoládé-Múzeum	Budapest	Hungary	
Museo del Cioccolato Antica Norba	Norma	Italy	
Museo Storico della Perugina	Perugia	Italy	Perugina chocolates
Felissimo Chocolate Museum	Kobe	Japan	Art museum featuring chocolate boxes
Shiroi Koibito Park	Sapporo	Japan	Operated by Ishiya
Chocolate museum	Jejudo	South Korea	
Chocolate museum (Latvia)	Pūre	Latvia	
Laima chocolate museum	Riga	Latvia	Laima chocolates
Museo del Chocolate (MUCHO)	Mexico City	Mexico	
Reino del Chocolate	Toluca	Mexico	
De Chocoladefabriek	Amsterdam	Netherlands	Planned museum, standby
Cacaomuseum	Amsterdam	Netherlands	Permanent exposition on the world of cacao and chocolate, rich assortment of bean to bar chocolate and other cacao and chocolate products
Gemeentemuseum Weesp	Weesp	Netherlands	Local history museum with large collection of chocolate cups and Van Houten memorabilia
Nederlands Bakkerij Museum	Hattem	Netherlands	"Dutch Bakery Museum", exhibits include Droste chocolate memorabilia, baking and confectionery equipment and memorabilia
Silky Oak 'Chocolate Thru' the Ages' Museum	Napier	New Zealand	
ChocoMuseo	Granada, Nicaragua	Nicaragua	
E. Wedel Chocolate Factory Museum	Warsaw	Poland	museum of chocolate and E. Wedel company
Museum of Russian Chocolate History	Moscow	Russia	Collection of Imperial and Soviet chocolate boxes and wrappings, a chocolate gift shop and master classes for children
Red October Museum of Chocolate	Moscow	Russia	Red October Chocolate,
Museum of Chocolate (Pokrov)	Pokrov	Russia	
The Chocolatarium	Edinburgh	Scotland	
Museo del Chocolate	Villajoyosa	Spain	Chocolates Clavileno
Museo del Chocolate Valor	Villajoyosa	Spain	Chocolates Valor
Museo del Chocolate Comes de Sueca	Sueca	Spain	Dedicado al chocolate a la piedra, "el Bollet"
Museu de la Xocolata	Barcelona	Spain	
Alimentarium	Vevey	Switzerland	Operated by Nestlé, includes exhibits on cooking, eating, purchasing food, digesting, and a history of Nestlé
Camille Bloch	Courtelary	Switzerland	Camille Bloch
Lindt Home of Chocolate	Kilchberg	Switzerland	Lindt
Maestrani	Flawil	Switzerland	Maestrani
Maison Cailler	Broc	Switzerland	Cailler
Shokoland	Caslano	Switzerland	Alprose Chocolates
Republic of Chocolate	Taoyuan	Taiwan	
Museum of Chocolate and Cafe	Orlando, Florida	United States	
Hershey's Chocolate World	Hershey, Pennsylvania	United States	
The Hershey Story	Hershey, Pennsylvania	United States	
South Bend Chocolate Company	South Bend, Indiana	United States	Tours of the chocolate factory and museum
Candy Americana Museum	Lititz, Pennsylvania	United States	Wilbur Chocolate Company
Choco-Story New York	New York City	United States	Affiliated with Jacques Torres Chocolate
Lindt Home of Chocolate		Switzerland	

== See also ==
- List of food and beverage museums
