= Choco-Story =

Choco-Story may refer to:

- Choco-Story Brugge
- Choco-Story Brussels
- Choco-Story New York
- Choco-Story Paris
- Choco-Story Praha
