= The Chocolatarium =

Chocolate museum in Edinburgh, Scotland

- Location within Edinburgh city centre
- Established: 2019; 7 years ago
- Location: 3-5 Cranston Street, Edinburgh EH8 8BE, Scotland, United Kingdom
- Coordinates: 55.9508°N 3.1840°W
- Type: Food museum
- Founder: Jenny McLay
- Public transit access: Edinburgh Waverley
- Website: www.chocolatarium.co.uk

Listed Building – Category B
- Official name: 4-18 (Even Nos) Jeffrey Street And 3-9 (Odd Nos) Cranston Street
- Designated: 13 August 1987
- Reference no.: LB29192

The Chocolatarium is a small museum and tourist attraction in Edinburgh, Scotland dedicated to chocolate. The attraction is located in a Category B listed Scots Baronial tenement block, adjacent to the Royal Mile.

The museum was founded by English language teacher Jenny McLay following a period living and working in Ecuador. It was designed to replicate the experience of European chocolate museums, in particular the Choco-Story, Brussels and the Museu de la Xocolata, Barcelona.

== Visitor Experience ==
The Chocolatarium's main attraction is the Tour of Chocolate, a 90 minute experience themed around the history of chocolate, including a tour of the chocolate factory alongside a guided tasting of several chocolate samples. Visitors create a bar of chocolate on the tour, which can be moulded into various shapes, such as Edinburgh Castle or Greyfriars Bobby. Several alternative experiences can be booked including truffle-making classes and wine pairings.

The museum runs educational tours for school parties with a stronger focus on the economics of Fairtrade and grower co-operatives.

The Chocolatarium operates a shop which sells unusual chocolate bars from around the world, such as a chocolate made from camel's milk. There is also an online shop, launched in 2025, which stocks products from local Scottish chocolatiers.

== Reception & Awards ==
Travel review website Tripadvisor named the Chocolatarium the "Best Food Experience in Britain" in 2022, and the "Best Thing to Do In Scotland" at the Tripadvisor Travelers Choice Awards in 2024.

== See also ==
- List of chocolate museums
