= Sablon diecast =

Miniature toy car maker from Belgium

Sablon 1:43 scale NSU Ro80 rotary engined car. Note the tires are original but hubcaps/wheels are not due to plastic reaction to rubber destroyed wheels on most models produced.

Sablon was a Belgian company near Brussels that made diecast zamac toy cars in the late 1960s and early 1970s. Models were mostly in 1:43 scale and were similar in concept to Dinky Toys or Solido.

== History ==
In 1968 the Sablon firm introduced nine 1:43 scale diecast models. This range consisted of a BMW 1600, a BMW 2000 coupe, a BMW 1600 GT Glas fastback coupe, a BMW Glas 3000 V-8 (which appears to be Italian bodied), a Porsche 911 Targa, a Mercedes 280 sedan, an NSU ro80 (which appeared to be a Danish Tekno knockoff), a Renault 16 sedan, and a Lamborghini Marzal (from Dinky tooling?)

Detail was quite good for most models and all apertures usually opened – and seams fit finely together. In detail and precision models were similar to French Solido or German Schuco. Similar to Solido headlights were often clear plastic lenses and not jewels as seen in Corgi or Dinky. Each model was offered painted in two or three colors. The Renault 16, the Porsche and Mercedes were also produced in 'Police' livery. A line of eight or so Mercedes LP trucks was also produced.

Sablon NSU Ro80 viewed from the front. Nice clear plastic pieces for headlights instead of jewels or painted plastic. This appears to be a recasting of an earlier Tekno.

Sablon also negotiated a promotion with Jaques Super Chocolat, a Belgian confectioner, supplying cars with chocolate purchases. These cars had a different labeling on the base which simply said "Jaques" and usually featured round white stickers on the doors of the cars with the logo of Jacques – a rearing knight on a horse.

== The Problem with Sablon ==
The main issue with Sablon toys was that a softener used in the rubber in the tires caused a chemical reaction with the plastic of the wheels causing a severe melting of the wheels This was an issue also seen in some other European models like AutoPilen whose tires would interact with the plastic base of the container. Sablon models came from the factory with this inherent defect, thus a Sablon surviving with perfect wheels and tires is a rare, if not impossible, find.

The line of Sablon Mercedes trucks apparently did not suffer from the wheel problem. Though they had the same wheel design, they wheels were unpainted (white, yellow, brown, etc.) and not chrome – or made of a distinct type of plastic.

Often, collectors seeking the keen detail of Sablon miniatures will replace the tires and wheels with different ones for a better appearance. Usually, the rubber would not be damaged and the melted wheels can be peeled away, revealing perfect tires. Perhaps if a collector wants an original Sablon as it was designed and produced in the factory – one may want at least one exhibiting the interesting defect.

== Packaging ==
Sablon shared casting dies and materials with Nacoral of Spain. Naturally, Nacoral had the same problems with corrosive reactions of plastics to compounds in the rubber tires as seen in this 1:24 scale Mercedes 350SL wheel.

Early Sablon Jacques models came in cardboard boxes that were red on the sides with the Chocolate company logo, with opposing sides featuring an actual photograph of the real car. Some of the Chocolat Jacques cars appeared in orange and yellow boxes labeled "Ecurie Renstal Jacques" or, Jacques Racing Team.

Cars supplied to Yonezawa appeared in a blue box with a photo of the model. Normal Sablon Cars also appeared in a rather strange clear plastic carriage with open sides and the model being supported within the clear plastic on a piece of cardboard. This whole assembly was put into an unmarked cardboard box. Others were in a clear flexible plastic container.

Boxes for the Mercedes trucks were orange with windows and featured thin blue and black stripes. They were marked "Production Sablon".

== Sharing of Tooling ==
After 1972, the tooling for several of these cars moved to Spain and were produced by Nacoral Intercars in Iberia. Nacoral, of Zaragoza, apparently got a license from Sablon, while simply copying the designs of other diecast makers in Europe. The BMW 1600, Mercedes Benz, and others can also be found with the Nacoral name on the base.

Tooling shared was precise enough that earlier Nacoral vehicles shared the melted wheel problem. Later Nacorals had hard plastic wheels that eliminated the issue. Still, detail on the original Sablons was much better and quality was excellent, while Nacorals, particularly the Mercedes 280 sedan could be crude with odd body shape, ill-fitting doors and poor paint application.

The highway goes two ways – there were also Nacoral offerings sold under the Sablon name. Nacoral models like the Lamborghini Espada (not an original Sablon offering) also were seen Jacques Super Chocolat models. Nacoral trucks were also offered as Sablons.

In addition, Sablon cars were also provided to the Japanese toy producer Yonezawa. Though Yonezawa was adept at making their own models, Sablons appear to have been supplied directly with no alterations – some developing the same melting of wheels, and others not. Boxes for the Japanese market were clearly marked with both the Sablon and the Yonezawa names.

Also, a few Sablon models, like the Lamborghini Marzal appeared as Inter-Cars from Nacoral manufactured Under License in New Zealand by Tonka Manufacturing Ltd., Auckland. One writer, however, questions whether they were perhaps Spanish made parts sent to New Zealand pre-painted and already partially assembled.

== What happened to Sablon? ==
It is uncertain what became of Sablon. Nacoral may have purchased the entire company and toy line, or perhaps just purchased tooling for a few models. In any event, except for some post-sharing of dies – the diecast cars that Sablon made did not last beyond about 1974. A couple of sources have said that Sablon still exists as a toy importer in Belgium.
