= Lindt Home of Chocolate =

Coordinates: 47.3184°N 8.5510°E

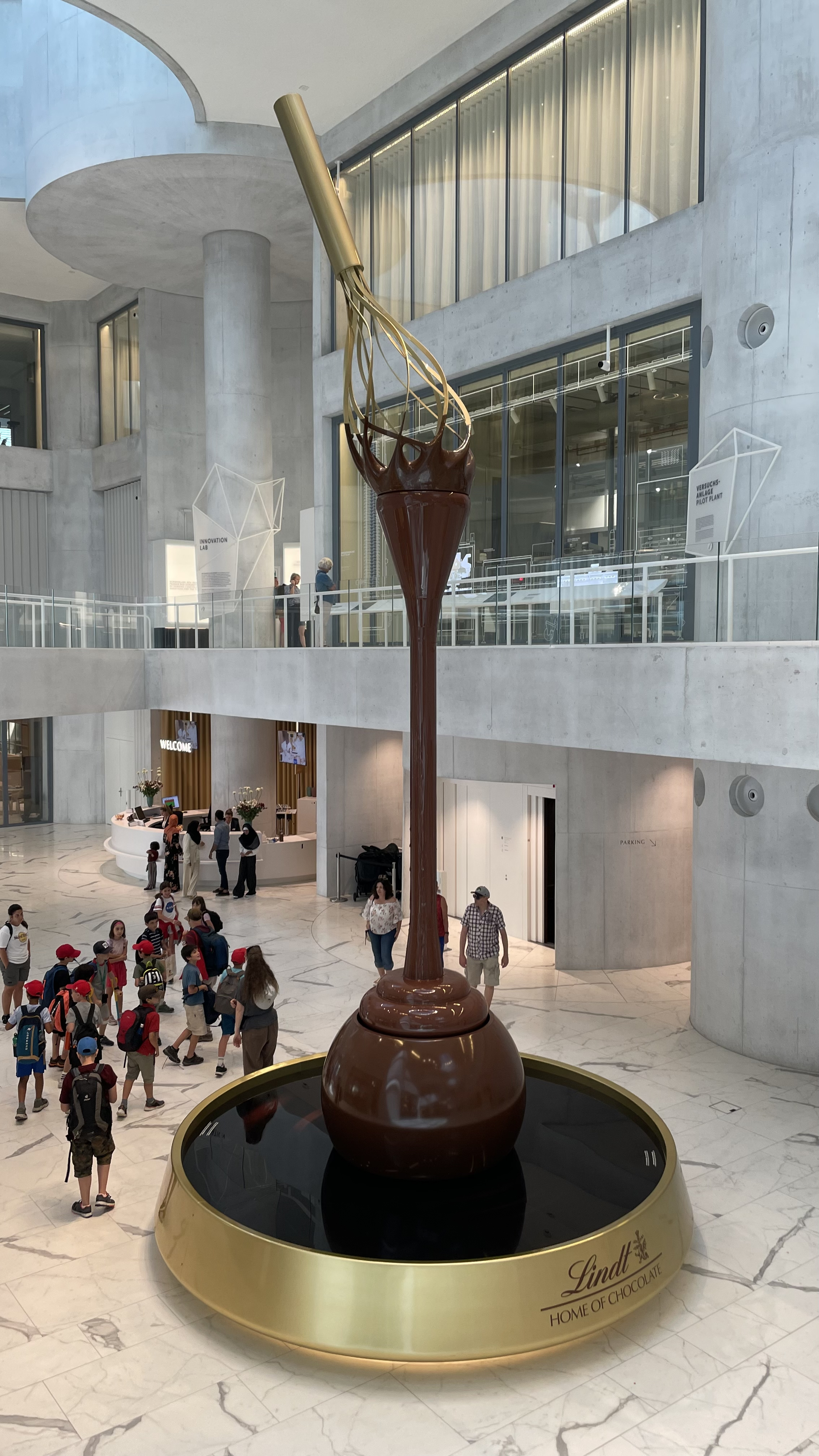
- The chocolate fountain in the building's lobby
- Interactive map of the Lindt Home of Chocolate area

General information
- Type: Museum, Visitor Center
- Architectural style: Modern
- Location: Kilchberg, Switzerland, Seestrasse 204, 8802 Kilchberg
- Construction started: 2017
- Completed: 2020
- Opening: September 2020
- Cost: CHF 100 million
- Client: Lindt Chocolate Competence Foundation
- Owner: Lindt & Sprüngli

Design and construction
- Architecture firm: Christ & Gantenbein

Website
- Official website

The Lindt Home of Chocolate is a chocolate museum, research center, and visitor attraction located in Kilchberg, in the canton of Zurich, Switzerland, adjacent to the headquarters of Lindt & Sprüngli. Opened in 2020, the building was developed by the Lindt Chocolate Competence Foundation and designed by the Swiss architecture firm Christ & Gantenbein. It is visited by around 800,000 people per year.

== Architecture ==
The Lindt Home of Chocolate was designed as a monumental yet minimalist structure inspired by industrial forms. The museum is centred on a naturally-lit atrium measuring 64 meters in length, 15 meters high, and 13 meters wide, supported by mushroom-shaped concrete columns. It features spiral staircases and a nine-meter-tall free-standing chocolate fountain, the largest of its kind in the world.

Over 3,000 m² of Statuario Altissimo porcelain stoneware slabs by the Italian ceramics company Ariostea were used in the museum's interior. The design of these were inspired by Carrara marble.

== Exhibitions and features ==
The museum covers the history of chocolate, from its Mesoamerican origins to the rise of Swiss chocolate-making. Some of the exhibits are interactive and contain digital elements. Other features include:

- A free-standing chocolate fountain, the world's largest
- A 500 m² Lindt retail store
- A Lindt Café
- Chocolate-making workshops, including some that cater specifically to children
- Guided tours
- Tastings
- A chocolate research and development center.

== Visitor statistics ==
In 2024, the museum hosted 817,163 visitors and ran 1,900 guided tours, including approximately 300 school classes.

Visitors primarily come from countries such as the United States, the United Kingdom, Germany, and India.

== Cultural impact ==
Architects Emanuel Christ and Christoph Gantenbein describe the project as a balance of classical grandeur and industrial production, with a goal of creating "an exaggeration of industrial production with a certain tension."

== Transport ==
Bus route 163 links the museum with Kilchberg railway station, which is a stop on the Zurich S-Bahn network. Another bus line, 165, links it with Zurich, Bürkliplatz.

== See also ==
- List of chocolate museums
- List of museums in Switzerland
