= Alprose =

Swiss chocolate manufacturer

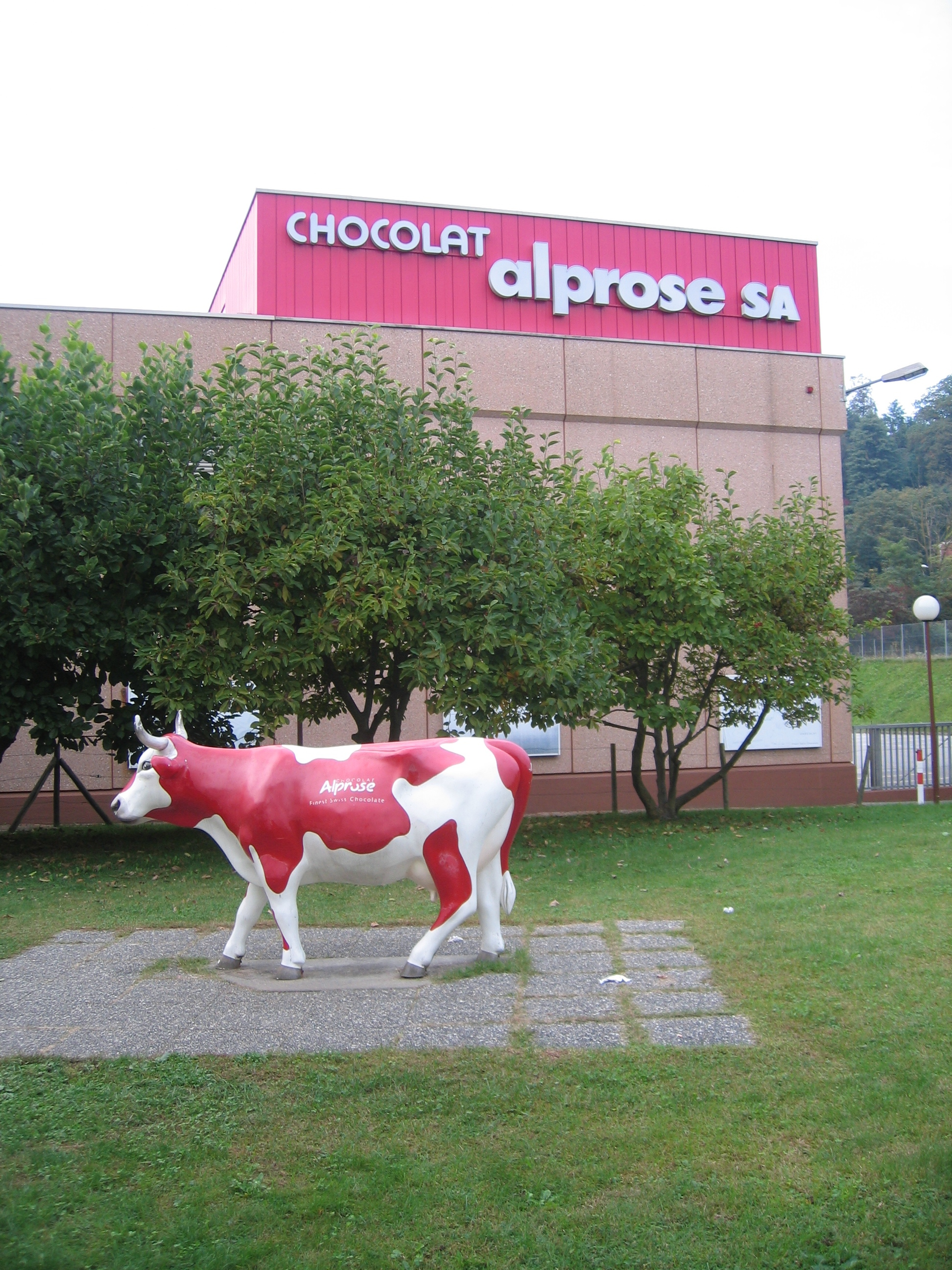
- Formerly: Titlis-Chocolat, Titlis SA, Chocolat Alprose SA
- Industry: Confectionery production
- Founded: 1957
- Headquarters: Caslano, Switzerland
- Area served: Worldwide
- Products: chocolate bars, napolitains and dragées
- Website: alprose.ch

Alprose is a Swiss chocolate producer based in Caslano (Ticino). It was founded in 1957 under the name Titlis SA (in reference to the mountain in the Swiss Alps) and received its current name in 1983.

== History ==
The company was founded in 1957 under the name Titlis-Chocolat. It was taken over by Dr Hans Imhoff as early as 1964. After Imhoff also took over Stollwerck, Alprose became part of Stollwerck AG in 1971. In 1992 the company was renamed to Chocolat Alprose using the already known brand name. Like Stollwerck, the Chocolate Alprose brand has belonged to Barry Callebaut from 2002 to 2011 and to Baronie since 2011.

== Products ==
Alprose produces a variety of chocolate bars, napolitains and dragées.

According to the company the chocolates are produced CO_{2}-neutrally.

== Projects ==
The company Alprose is involved in research projects on the Alpine flora, in collaboration with the Swiss National Park. It also collaborates with the Swiss Alpine Club.

== Factory ==
The factory in Caslano includes a visitor center and museum, which was inaugurated in 1991. An elevated corridor in the factory allows visitors to watch the production of chocolate bars from the cocoa beans.

== See also ==
- Swiss chocolate
- List of chocolate museums
- List of museums in Switzerland
