= Choco-Story New York =

Coordinates: 40.727664°N 74.00683°W

Choco-Story New York: The Chocolate Museum and Experience with Jacques Torres was a museum of the history of chocolate-making. It was associated with Jacques Torres Chocolate, a chocolate manufacturer, wholesaler and retailer whose flagship store was on the premises.

Located in the Hudson Square neighborhood of Manhattan, the museum was in space formerly occupied by the Jacques Torres manufacturing operation, which has since been moved to a much larger space in Brooklyn. The 5,000-square-foot (460 m^{2}) museum displayed artifacts related to the history of making chocolate, such as pottery and knives, going back to the time of the Maya in 3500 BC, as well items used in chocolate's consumption, such as a 1750 cup from Spain made of cocoanut shell and silver. There were also chocolate-making demonstrations and tastings, showing how bon bons and traditional Mexican hot chocolate are made. There was a play area for children where they could dig for chocolate-related "artifacts" or pretend they are running a retail chocolate store and kitchen. Hands-on classes for adults were also available.

The idea for the museum was presented to Jacques Torres by Eddy Van Belle, who had previously set up Choco-Story museums in Belgium, France and Mexico. This was the fifth such museum. It opened on March 7, 2017, and closed as of March 1, 2019.

== See also ==
- Choco-Story, the museum in Bruges, Belgium
