= Chocolate Museum Zagreb =

Private chocolate museum in Zagreb, Croatia

- Muzej čokolade Zagreb
- Entrance to the museum at Gundulićeva 26
- Established: 25 November 2019; 6 years ago
- Location: Gundulićeva 26, Zagreb, Croatia
- Type: Private thematic museum
- Collections: History, culture and production of chocolate
- Website: muzejcokolade.hr

Chocolate Museum Zagreb (Croatian: Muzej čokolade Zagreb) is a privately owned museum dedicated to chocolate, opened on 25 November 2019 in Zagreb, Croatia. Its interactive exhibition traces the history, culture and production of chocolate from Mesoamerican civilizations to the present day.

== History ==
The museum was founded by the married couple Ružica Božić Cerovac and Domagoj Ilija Cerovac, chocolate enthusiasts who had no prior professional background in museums or confectionery. According to the founders, the idea for the museum arose after several years of travelling, during which they visited numerous European chocolate museums. They gathered exhibits worldwide, at auctions and fairs, and commissioned Croatian artists to make replicas of items that could not be obtained.

The museum was originally located in Varšavska Street in central Zagreb. In early 2025 it moved to larger premises at Gundulićeva 26; the new location was officially opened on 31 January 2025 as part of the Night of Museums.

== Permanent exhibition ==
The permanent exhibition is arranged chronologically across seven themed rooms, each with its own set design, background music, historical exhibits and tasting stations. The first room is dedicated to the origin of the cacao tree in Mesoamerica; subsequent rooms cover chocolate drinks at European courts and modern pralines, and the last houses a production laboratory and a boutique. The exhibits include historical objects related to the preparation of chocolate, such as old moulds, a molinillo and porcelain vessels.

The space includes a laboratory, a tasting room, a demonstration counter and small chocolate fountains. During the tour, visitors receive a tasting set with a roasted cocoa bean and samples of dark, milk, white and ruby chocolate. The museum also has a shop selling the products of Croatian craft chocolatiers.

The museum's interior was designed by Željka Zrnić in collaboration with the design studios Woodmark and Treća verzija.

== Awards and recognition ==
For the museum's interior design by Željka Zrnić, in 2020 it received the BIG SEE Tourism Design Award in the "Creative story and identity as experience" category. The same year, the museum won a bronze plaque in the best cultural-tourism product category at the 6th International Congress on Historic Cities, was a finalist for the Zagreb Design Week award in the spatial-design category, and was included in the selection of the 55th Zagreb Salon organised by the Croatian Association of Applied Arts Artists (ULUPUH). In 2021 the museum received a special mention in the category of the contribution of cultural and creative industries to the development of cultural tourism at the Destination of Sustainable Cultural Tourism Awards of the European Cultural Tourism Network (ECTN). The same year it was featured as a business case study in the university textbook Osnove marketinga ("Principles of Marketing") of the Faculty of Economics and Business, University of Zagreb.

== Franchise ==
The founders developed a franchise system, Diveinto Chocolate Museum, intended for the international expansion of the museum concept. The museum holds the Franchise Excellence Certificate of the Croatian Franchise Association and was a finalist for the Franchise Brand Leader Award in 2022.

== Events and activities ==
In addition to the permanent exhibition, the museum organises praline-making workshops, tasting workshops, guest exhibitions and programmes for groups and children's birthdays. At the new Gundulićeva location, chocolate production was also set up, allowing visitors to observe the manufacturing process.

Since 2022, the museum has held an annual fair dedicated to craft chocolate and specialty coffee at the Family mall shopping centre in Zagreb. The first edition was held from 24 to 27 February 2022 under the name "Days of Chocolate, Confectionery and Coffee", while later editions were held under the name "Days of Chocolate and Coffee". Exhibitors from several European countries take part, and alongside the sales section the programme includes praline- and chocolate-making workshops and coffee education. The third edition, held from 1 to 3 March 2024, gathered 75 exhibitors from Croatia, Slovenia, Serbia, Italy and Austria and, according to the organisers, attracted about 40,000 visitors. The fifth, anniversary edition was held from 13 to 15 February 2026, with more than 50 exhibitors from six European countries.

The museum takes part every year in the Night of Museums (Croatian: Noć muzeja), beginning in 2020 when it participated for the first time. During the 2023 Night of Museums, when it was one of 84 participants in Zagreb, large crowds formed in front of the museum and some visitors were unable to enter.

=== 2026 exhibition "Chocolate – the Secret of the Baroque Boudoir" ===
In collaboration with the Marton Museum, the museum staged the exhibition "Chocolate – the Secret of the Baroque Boudoir" from 17 April to 21 June 2026, presenting selected items from the collection of Veljko Marton, one of the most significant private collections of porcelain and silver in Croatia. The exhibition addressed chocolate as a luxury beverage of the 17th- and 18th-century European aristocracy and included valuable examples of European porcelain and vessels for preparing and serving chocolate (chocolatière).

=== Guest exhibitions ===
The museum also prepares travelling exhibitions hosted at other Croatian museums. In Karlovac, in collaboration with the Karlovac City Museum, the exhibition "History of Chocolate" was staged at Dubovac Old Town from 12 October 2022 to 28 February 2023; the display was designed by the museum curator Marko Španjol, and the visit was initiated by the museum educator Marinko Pleskina.

In Opatija, at the Croatian Museum of Tourism, in co-organisation with the Chocolate Museum, the exhibition "From Bean to Chocolate: A Journey Through Time" was staged from 6 November 2025 to 15 February 2026, presenting the five-thousand-year history of chocolate through more than 150 exhibits; the exhibition was also authored and curated by Marko Španjol.
