= Halloren Chocolate Factory =

German chocolate factory

Halloren Schokoladenfabrik AG
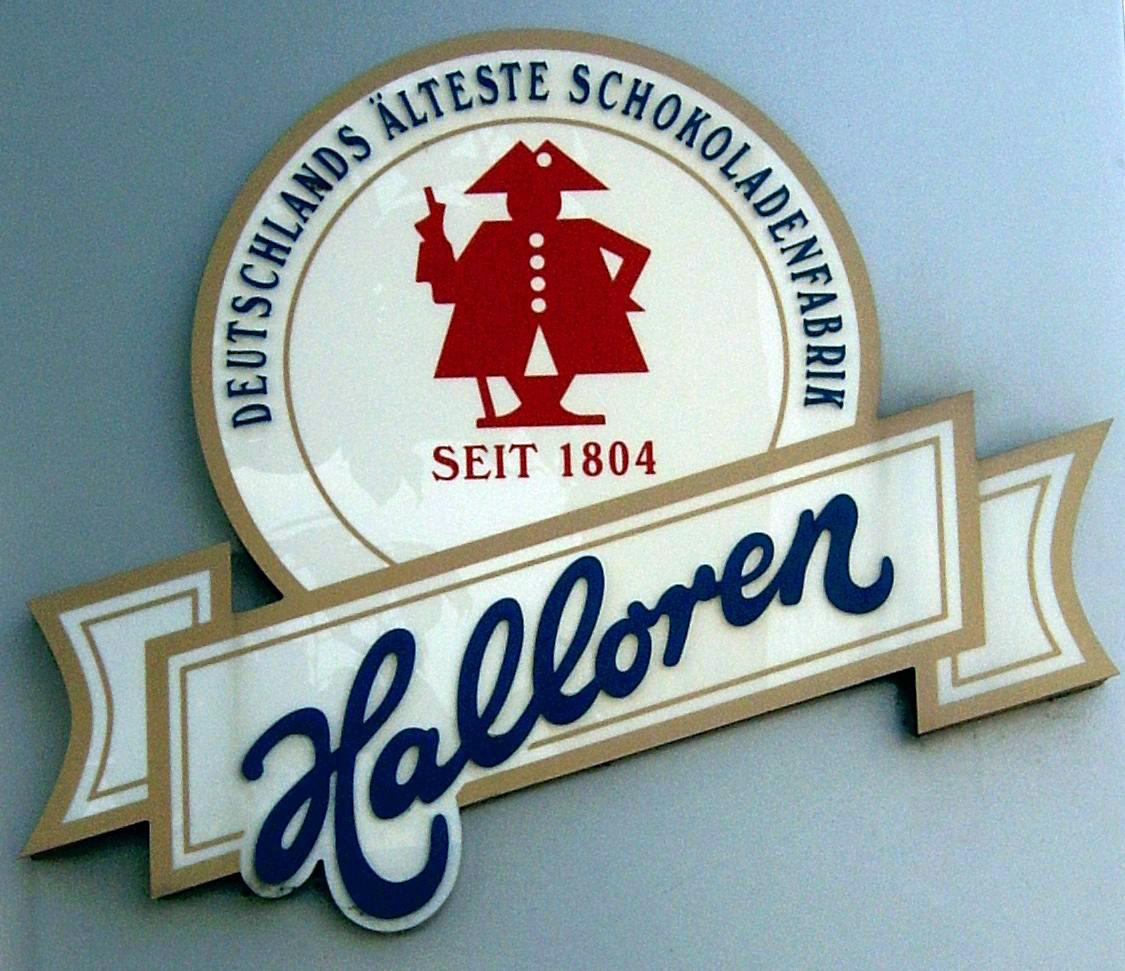
- Trade name: FRA:H2R
- Formerly: Friedrich David & Söhne, David Söhne AG, Mignon Schokoladenwerke AG
- Type: Public
- Industry: Food industry
- Founded: 1804
- Founder: Friedrich August Miethe
- Headquarters: Halle (Saale), Germany
- Key people: Paul Morzynski (Chairman); Klaus Lellé (CEO); Gerrit Sachs (CEO); Ralf Wilfer (Executive Director); Darren Ehlert (Executive Director)
- Number of employees: 157 (2023)
- Website: https://www.halloren.de/

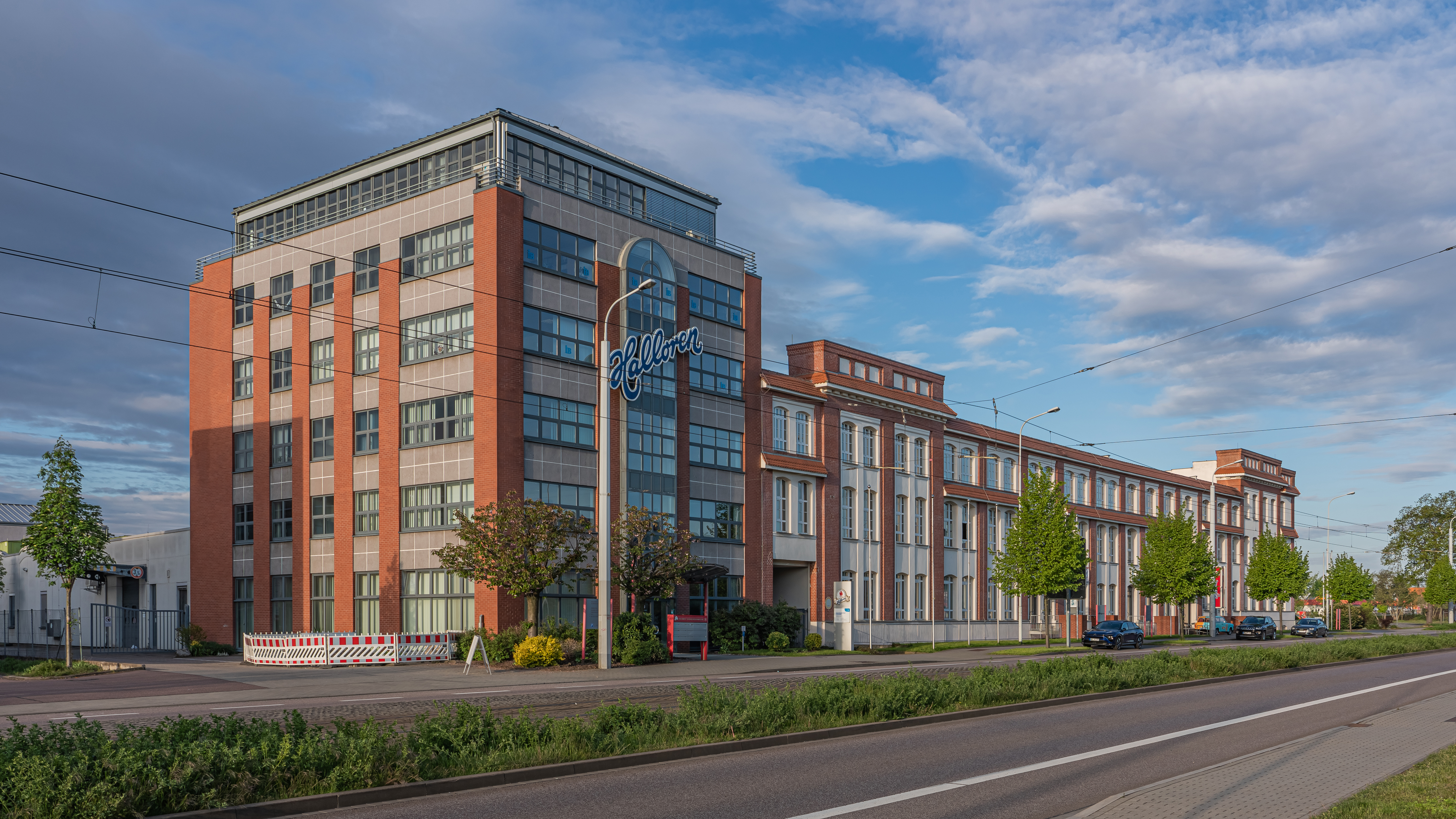
Main building of the Halloren Factory in Halle (Saale)

The Halloren Chocolate Factory (German: Halloren Schokoladenfabrik) is the oldest continuously operating chocolate factory in Germany. The majority shareholder is Magrath Holding, which belongs to In-West Partners GmbH, the Westphalian real estate partnership of the Ehlert and Illmann families. Its most famous products are the "Halloren-Kugeln", or Halloren globes, which receive their name from the early salt workers, the "Halloren", whose festive dress has ball-shaped buttons which the chocolates resemble. The brand was especially popular in the former German Democratic Republic and remained popular after reunification.

== History ==
=== 18th Century to 1945 ===
The company was founded as a cocoa and chocolate factory in Halle (Saale), Saxony-Anhalt, by Friedrich August Miethe (1753–1827), the father of Johann Friedrich Miethe. The first mention of the firm dates back to records from 1804 as a honey cake bakery. In 1851, the confectioner Friedrich David took over the business. From then on, the company was called Friedrich David & Söhne and became widely known for its praline chocolates under the Mignon Brand.

In 1905, the company was converted into a joint-stock company and renamed David Söhne AG. In 1912, the first delivery vehicles were introduced.

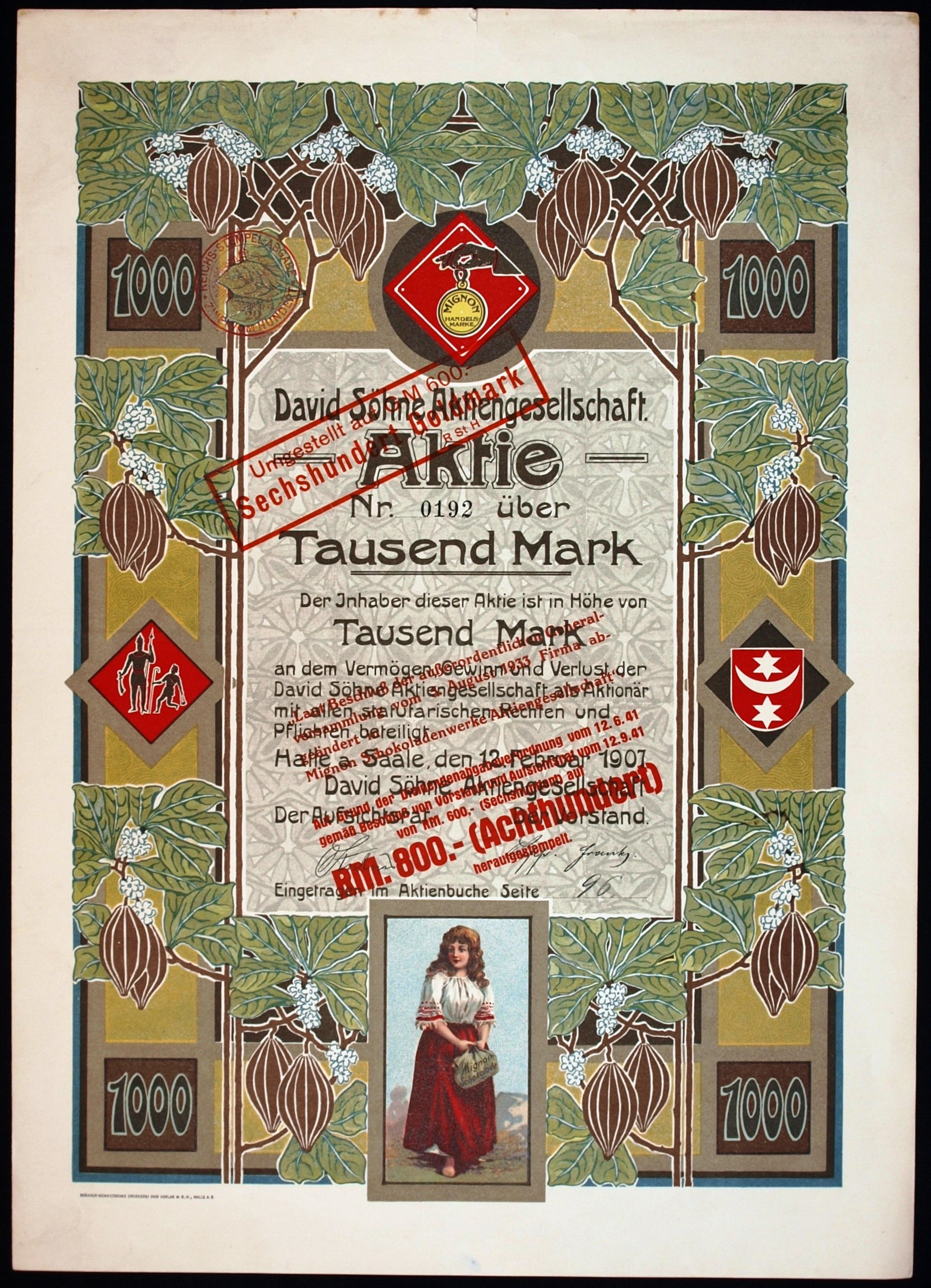
Share certificate of over 1,000 Marks of David Söhne AG, dated February 12th, 1907

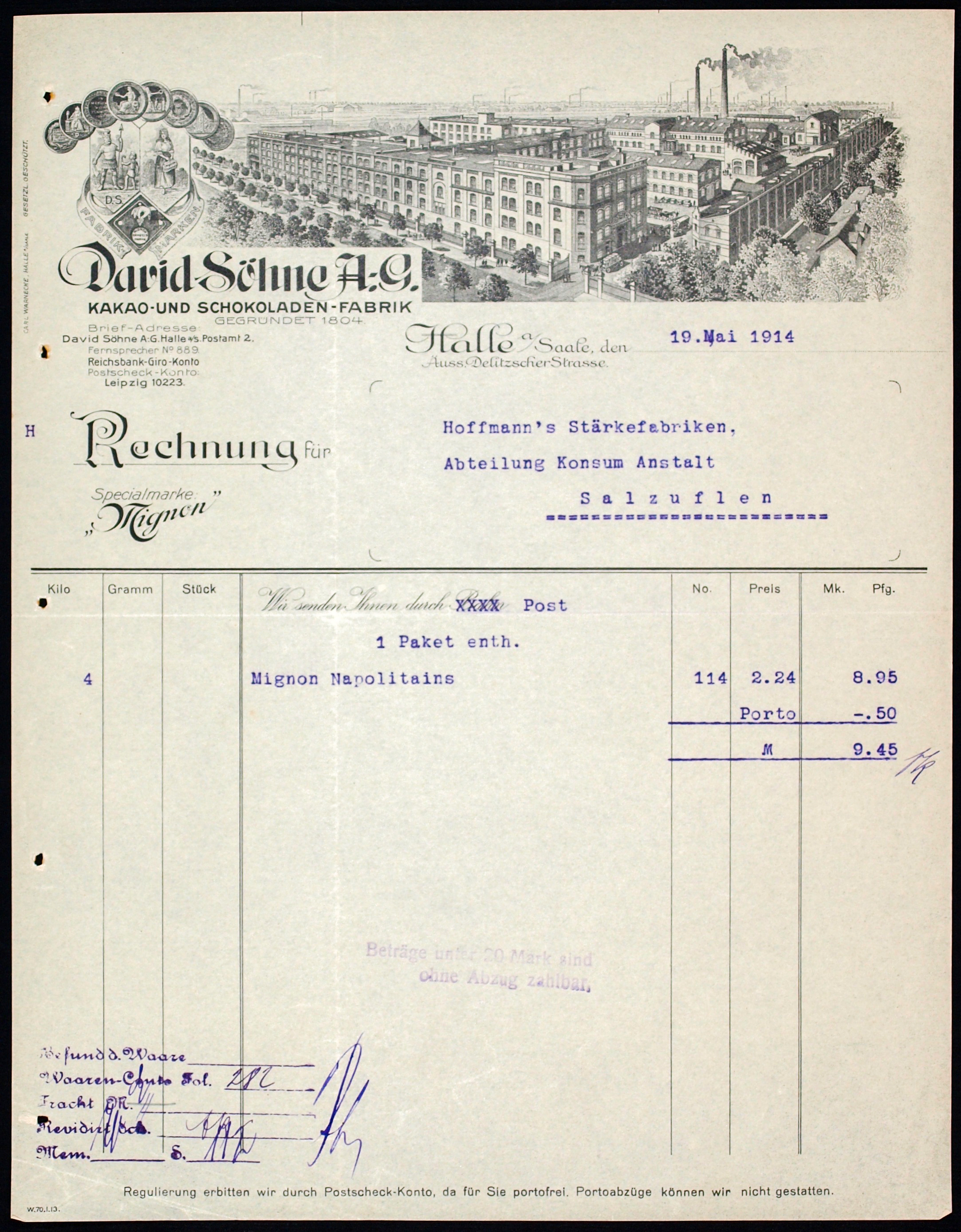
Invoice of David Söhne AG, dated May 19th, 1914

In 1934, the company was renamed Mignon Schokoladenwerke AG by the National Socialists (Nazis) on account of the Jewish name "David" being in the former title. Confectionery production was discontinued during World War II, and parts of the factory were repurposed by Siebel to produce aircraft wing components.

=== Postwar Period ===
After production resumed, the chocolate factory was expropriated in 1950 and converted into a state-owned enterprise (Volkseigener Betrieb). In 1952, the company was named Halloren, referencing the Halle-based brotherhood of salt workers known by the same name. From 1980, the operation was part of the VEB Kombinat Süßwaren Delitzsch, of which the VEB "Halloren" Schokoladenfabrik Halle became the parent company in 1988. During this reorganization, the combined company was renamed VEB Kombinat Süßwaren Halle.

In 1992, the trust agency (Treuhandanstalt) sold the company to the Halloren Beteiligungsgesellschaft mbH of Hanover, owned by auditor and entrepreneur Paul Morzynski.

=== 21st Century ===
Since 2000/2001, the Confiserie Dreher of Munich, founded in 1880, has been an independent brand within Halloren Schokoladenfabrik, bringing its Mozart balls with it. In 2002, Weibler Confiserie & Chocolaterie GmbH in Cremlingen was acquired.

In 2007, the company was converted into a public limited company, the Halloren Schokoladenfabrik AG. Before the initial public offering, Paul Morzynski held 90 percent of the shares, serving as the principal shareholder and chairman of the supervisory board. On May 11th, 2007, the company was listed on the Frankfurt Stock Exchange in the Entry Standard segment. The opening price was 10 cents above the issue price of €7 (8.10 US Dollars). The company placed shares worth €15.6 million (~$18 million), of which €6.3 million (~$7.2 million) went to existing shareholders. Additionally, a glass-walled factory was opened where visitors can observe the production process, and the chocolate museum was further expanded. In 2008, the Delitzscher Schokoladenfabrik GmbH was acquired.

In 2010, the company achieved revenues of €60.55 million (~$70 million).

In 2011, Halloren Schokoladenfabrik AG became a co-shareholder and production site of Wunschpralinen Manufaktur GmbH, which offers individually customized pralines that customers can design themselves. The Dutch company Steenland Chocolate was purchased that same year.

In 2012, Halloren launched an online shop.

In 2013, the company secured a majority share in the Belgian chocolate producer Bouchard. Revenue stood at €118 million (~$136.5 million), rising to €122 million (~$141.2 million) by 2015. Foreign sales accounted for a quarter of the revenue, with Denmark, Canada, and Romania playing notable roles. However, Halloren had been unable to record any meaningful operating profit for years; positive results were attributable solely to one-off effects.

In 2014, Halloren took on capital from Magrath Holding to address its high liabilities. Following its purchase of Bouchard shares and its desire to increase its international presence, the company expressed interest in expanding into North America and Asia, specifically Thailand and South Korea, due to intense competition in the food retail sector. In December 2014, a profit of ~€2 million (~$2.3 million) was projected for the following year. However, profits collapsed by more than 90% in 2015. By that year, Charlie Investors held a larger stake than the then-principal shareholder and supervisory board chairman, Paul Morzynski. With ~26% of shares, Charlie Investors held a blocking minority. Darren Ehlert, who had previously served as the managing director at the real estate firm In-West Partners, was elected to the supervisory board.

In December 2016, the company was delisted from the stock exchange to reduce costs and refocus on core operations. With an amendment to the articles of association on October 11th, 2017, the shares of Halloren Schokoladenfabrik AG were converted from bearer shares to registered shares. At the end of 2017, major shareholder Paul Morzynski sold his stake to Darren Ehlert, making Ehlert the majority owner.

In 2017, revenue totaled only €107.7 million (~$124.08 million), and loss was €3.6 million (~$4.1 million). To secure the company's long-term future, Halloren Schokoladenfabrik presented a long-term strategy at its general meeting in September 2017. This strategy included: full debt elimination, divestiture of subsidiaries, a focus on the core business, and expansion of distribution for the company's flagship product, the Halloren-Kugel. Part of the strategy also involved board member Klaus Lellé dedicating his full efforts to expanding distribution, which was announced at the 2017 general meeting and implemented the next year. The strategy was subsequently implemented step by step: subsidiaries Delitzscher Schokoladenfabrik and Bouchard were sold to Magrath Holding and remained closely connected to Halloren, despite the change in ownership. Overall costs were reduced while operational synergies were preserved. Steenland was divested as part of the same process.

To enable the then-CEO Klaus Lellé to assume responsibility for sales as planned, Ralf Wilfer, a recognized expert in the confectionery industry, was brought on board as an additional executive director effective October 1st, 2018. That same year, Halloren completed the sale of its last remaining subsidiary, Weibler Confiseries Chocolaterie, with 140 employees for €1 million (~$1.15 million). Halloren thereafter held an equity ratio of just under 70%.

In 2019, Darren Ehlert joined the board as an additional executive member. Under his leadership, the distribution of the Halloren-Kugel was further expanded. To save on additional costs, the product range and internal structures were streamlined. Meanwhile, the company set a new sales record with 14.5 million boxes of Halloren-Kugels being sold, though it recorded a loss of €2.9 million (~$3.3 million) on total revenues of €27 million (~$31.1 million). Halloren expanded its sales in its home markets of Saxony-Anhalt, Saxony, and Thuringia, while also gaining greater recognition in western German markets such as North Rhine-Westphalia. By the year's end, the company's restructuring had been completed. In 2020, Halloren set another sales record for its flagship product, the Halloren-Kugel, with 16.5 million boxes sold, followed by 16.8 million boxes in 2021.

As a result of the subsidiary divestitures and the focus on core operations, Halloren was well positioned to weather the COVID-19 crisis, though revenue shrank to €22.9 million (~$26.3 million) and the workforce fell from more than 260 to 156 employees in 2021. As announced at the 2021 general meeting by executive director Darren Ehlert, the company's remaining debts were repaid in August of that year. Halloren has been debt-free since then. In August of 2024, short-time work was announced through the end of the year following a pricing dispute with major retail customer Lidl, which had wanted to substantially reduce its purchasing prices. 280 of the company's 400 employees were affected, and revenue was expected to fall by one quarter as a result of losing the major customer.

== Headquarters ==
The company's headquarters remain in Halle. Production continues in the original factory building, constructed in 1896, which also houses a factory outlet. The factory also features the Halloren Chocolate Museum (German: Halloren Schokoladenmuseum), which includes exhibits about the history of chocolate, chocolate-making equipment, molds, and a view of the factory process. The museum has been open to visitors since 2002.

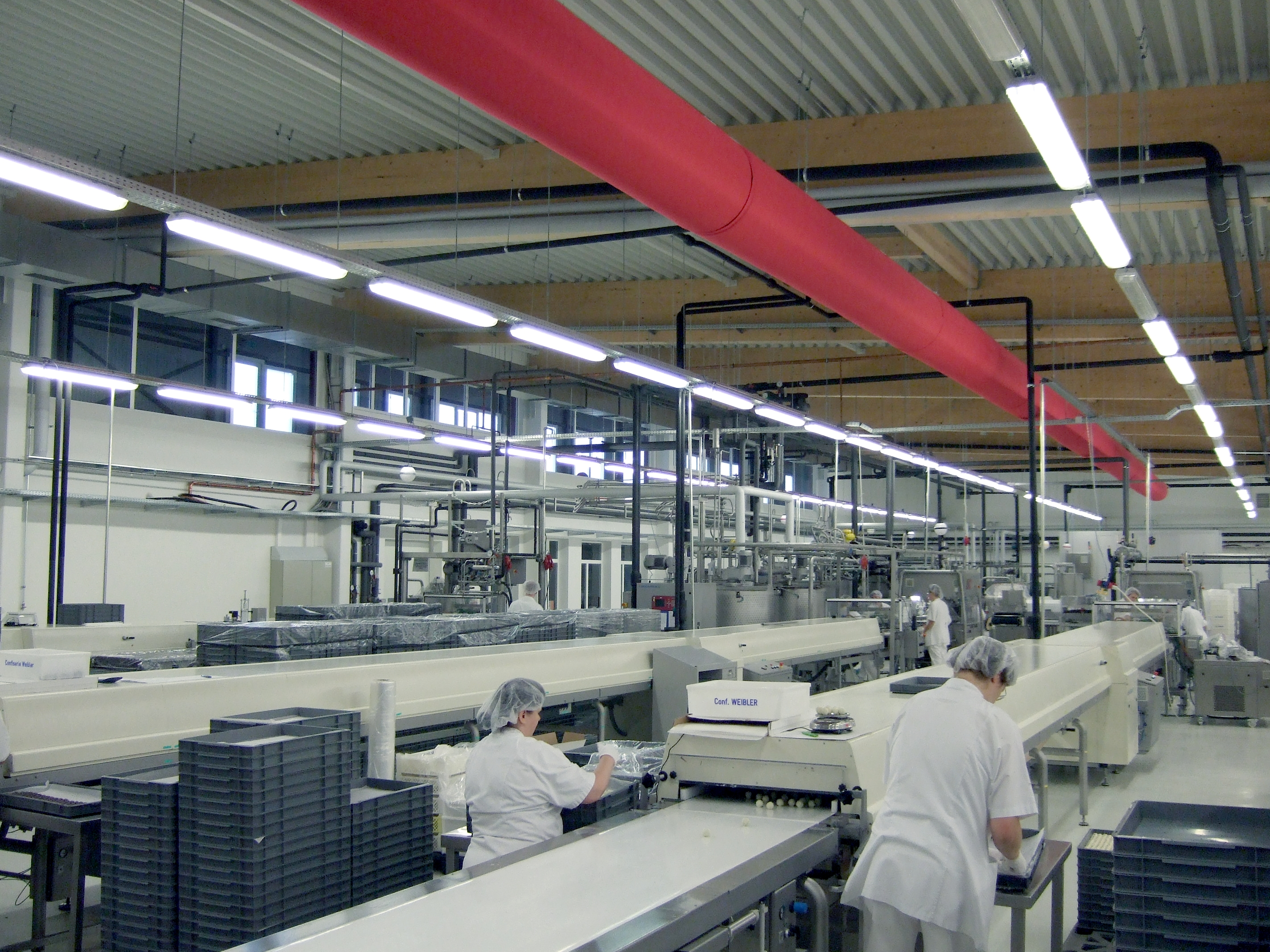
The interior of the Halloren Chocolate Factory in Halle (Saale)

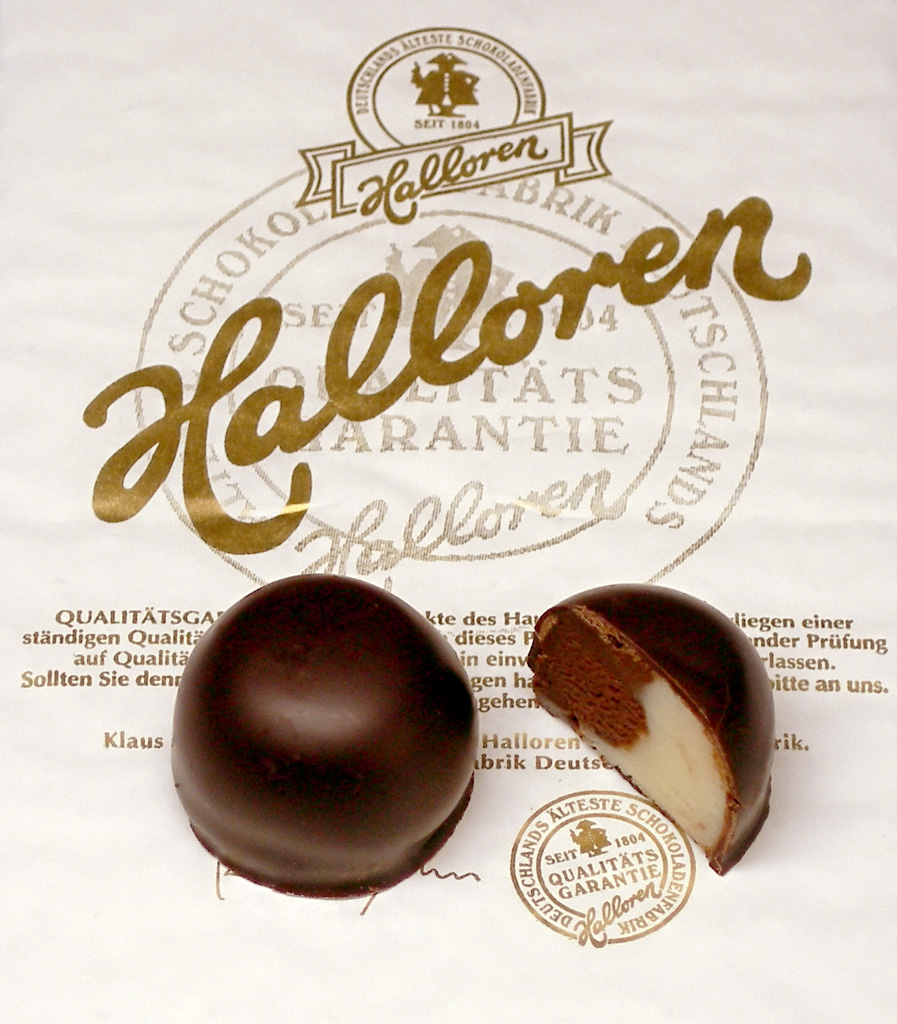
Halloren-Kugeln

== Products ==
The most popular of the company's ~120 products are the Original Halloren O's (formerly known as Halloren-Kugeln), which have been produced since 1952. Until 1956, they were produced by hand. The Halloren O's are marketed as an East German product.

== Awards ==
- Winner of the Großer Preis des Mittelstandes competition (2002)
- Central German Marketing Prize (Mitteldeutscher Marketingpreis) (2004)

== Literature ==
- Heinemann, Michael (2007), Geschichte der Süßwarenindustrie der DDR, IZS-Verlag, p. 165, ISBN 978-3-9808866-4-2
- Halloren Schokoladen-Büchlein, Leipzig: Buchverlag für die Frau, 2001, ISBN 3-89798-041-X
