= Blocking minority =

Blocking minority may refer to:

- Filibuster is a political procedure where one or more members of a parliament (or congress/senate) extend debate over a proposed piece of legislation so as to delay or entirely prevent a decision being made on the proposal.
- Golden share is one which is able to outvote all other shares in certain specified circumstances.
- Minority interest is a principle of corporate accounting where a shareholder may hold less than 50% of the stock but, through special voting rights, may be able to block proposals by the majority shareholders.
  - Article 5 of the European Union's Takeover Directive specifies that the rights of minority share-holders must be protected but the precise thresholds are for each Member State to determine.
  - In Germany, a GmbH (German: Gesellschaft mit beschränkter Haftung, Company with limited liability), a 75% majority is required for amendments to the articles of association, making 25% a blocking minority.
  - The Companies Act 2006 in the United Kingdom gives minority shareholders certain rights.
  - Minority shareholder protections in United States corporate law may amount to a blocking minority.
- Voting in the Council of the European Union uses 'qualified majority voting', which means that a significant minority of countries and populations may block a proposal even if a simple majority favours it.

== See also ==
- Consociationalism, a form of power sharing used (in place of a majoritarian electoral system), to avoid one ethnic or religious group having a permanent monopoly on government power to the exclusion of all others.
- Cross-community vote, in the Northern Ireland Assembly, when a measure requires separate majorities in each of the nationalist and the unionist communities
