= Museu de la Xocolata =

Chocolate museum in Barcelona, Spain

Coordinates: 41°23′14.74″N 2°10′53.84″E

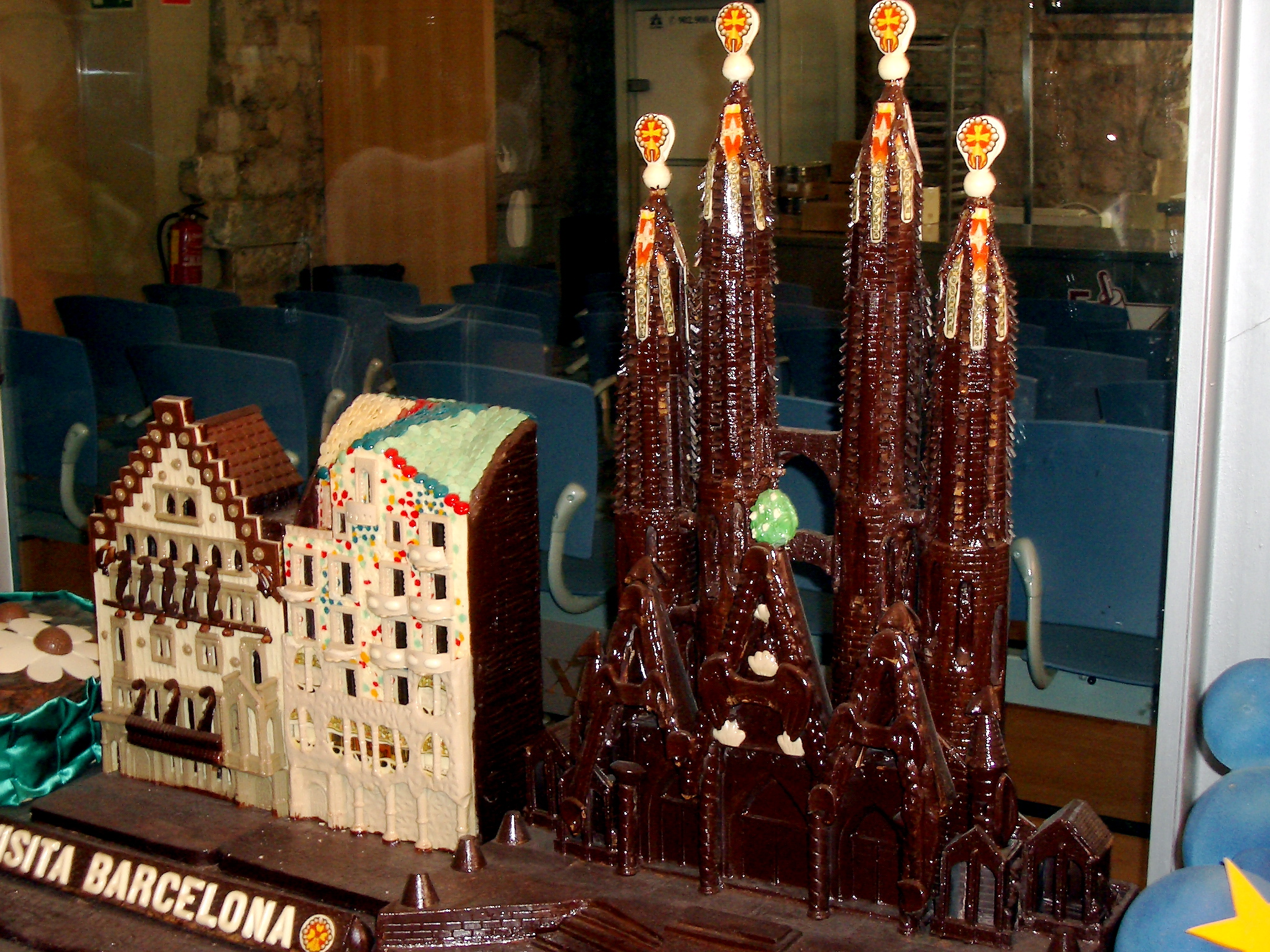
Barcelona in chocolate: a replica of Sagrada Família, Casa Batlló, and Casa Amatller.

Museu de la Xocolata or Museo del Chocolate in Spanish, ("Museum of Chocolate") is a private museum in Barcelona, Catalonia, Spain, owned by the Gremio de Pastelería de Barcelona (the city pastry-makers' guild).

The museum opened in 2000, at Calle Comercio 36, in El Born, Ciudad Vieja, on the ground level of an old barrack.

Many of the displays are chocolate sculptures, including various well-known Barcelona buildings, and illustrations from various stories.

== See also ==
- List of chocolate museums
