= Chocolala Chocolate Museum =

Museum in Tallinn, Estonia

- Chocolala Šokolaadimuuseum
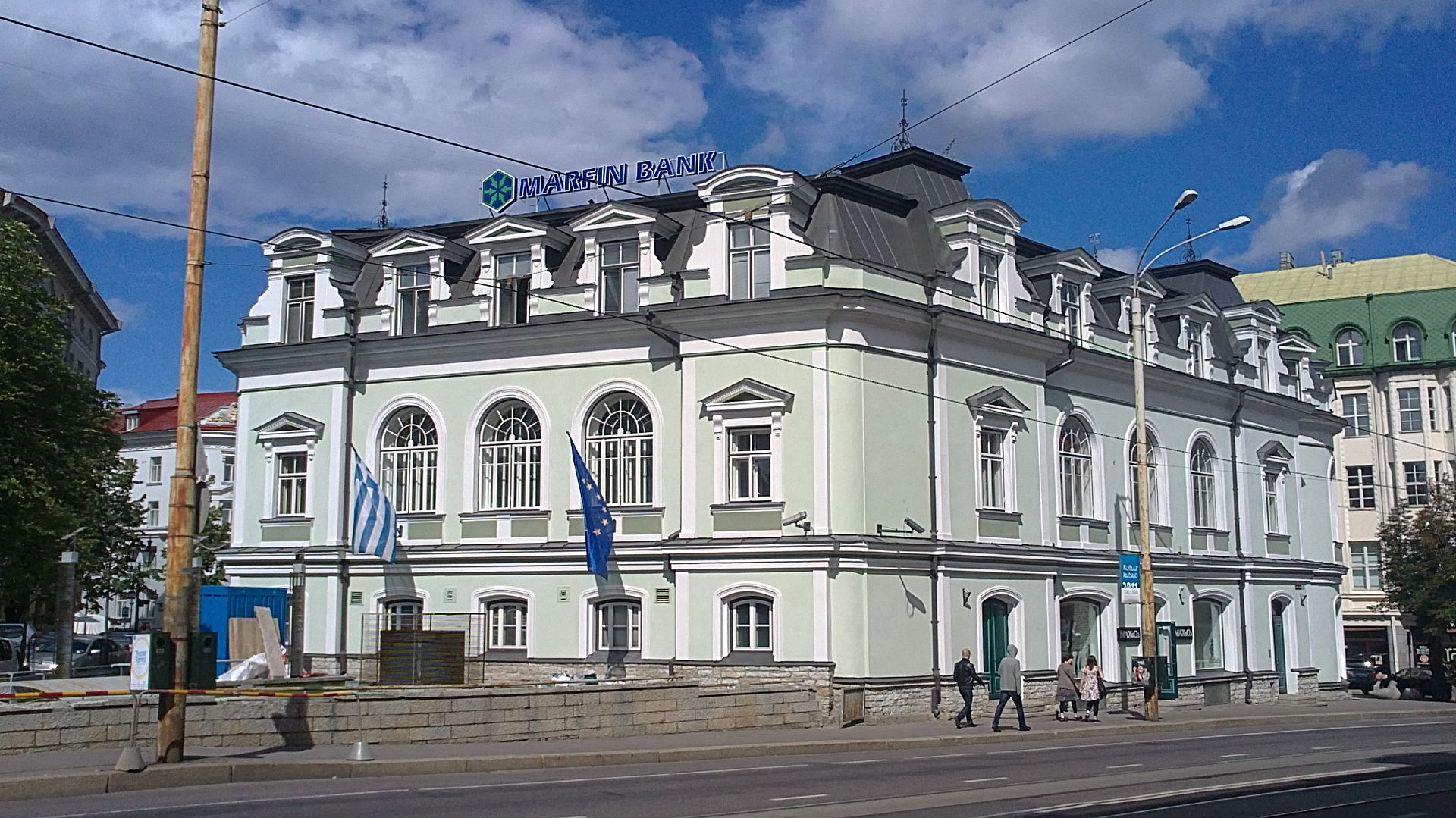
- Exterior view of the Building
- Established: June 1, 2018
- Location: Suur-Karja 20, Tallinn, Estonia
- Coordinates: 59.4347722°N 24.7469108°E
- Type: Specialty museum
- Founder: Kristi Lehtis
- Website: www.chocolatemuseum.ee

Chocolala Chocolate Museum (Estonian: Chocolala Šokolaadimuuseum) is a specialty museum dedicated to the history of the Estonian chocolate industry. It is located in the Tallinn Old Town district near Freedom Square, Tallinn, Estonia.

== History ==
The museum opened to the public on 1 June 2018. Its founder, Kristi Lehtis, is an established Estonian chocolate maker and chocolate art collector. The objective of the museum is to show and inform visitors about the history of the Estonian chocolate industry and traditions since 1806.

== Building ==
The museum is located in a historical building bordering on Suur-Karja Street 20 / Pärnu Road 12. The Property was built in the years 1899–1900 by architects Rudolf von Engelhardt and Nikolai Thamm Jr. for Tallinn's German Club.

The premises are located around a courtyard, the main hall is located on Suur-Karja street. The building was remodeled in 1922, 1928 and 1938 according to plans by architect Edgar Johan Kuusik. By then, the building was housing Krediit Bank and the main Post Office. In the basement of the building, parallel to Pärnu maantee, there was a bowling alley.

Between 1913 and 1939, Paul Kroll's hairdressing company was located in the building.

Today, the building comprises business offices. Chocolala Chocolate Museum is located in the basement of the building that used to serve as the vault of a local bank.

== Collections ==
The collections of the museum are categorized into boxes, wrappings, and molds for chocolate and marzipan. There are approximately 1,500 items, exposed in a 150 square meters dedicated space. Movies on Estonian chocolate making from the 1930s and 1950s are projected. The museum exposes also original art pieces from Estonian artists, such as a large chocolate sculpture inspired from a work by Simson von Seakyl, a dress made from chocolate wrappings, a wall painting of the Mayan God Quetzalcoatl and a cocoa tree.

== Prepare your visit ==
Tallinn confectionery industry is over two centuries old. A guild of sugar bakers, making cakes, chocolate, marmalade and marzipan existed at the beginning of the 18 century. Marzipan particularly was made in Tallinn since the Middle Ages and was sold at the Town council pharmacy of Tallinn for pains of unrequited love and for stimulating mental activity.

=== 19th century ===
Lorenz Cawiezel, a sugar baker who had trained in Switzerland bought a house in Tallinn Pikk Street and established a confectionery shop there in 1806. The house stood at the place where the Café Maiasmokk is located now. In 1864, Georg Stude bought the property and extended it to the neighbouring building. The new chocolate and marzipan confectionery became known far and wide, even the Tsar's court in Saint Petersburg sent for these sweets.

=== The golden age (1900–1940) ===
The golden age of Estonian confectioners was the period of the Independent Republic of Estonia (1918–40). The local confectionery industry developed rapidly in the mid-1920s, although slowing down during the 1929 economic crisis (1929–33). It picked up quickly again beginning from 1934/35 because customs policies put into place at that time favored the local industry. Protective customs tariffs discouraged the import of manufactured sweets and at the same time, low tariffs were set for raw ingredients used in confectionery. Very quickly, Estonian confectionery producers became very competitive. About ten major confectioneries were active in Tallinn in the 1920s and the 1930s. Kawe, Ginovker, Brandmann and Klausson were the largest but the smaller businesses like G. Stude, Riola, Efekt, Endla, Eelis, Soliid and some others were worthy rivals to the big ones. In 1937, Kawe produced 1,416 tonnes of sweets, followed by Ginovker at 573 tonnes and Brandmann at 483 tonnes. The total production of the sweets industry was of more than 3,000 tonnes in 1937.

==== Kawe ====
Kawe was established by two brothers Karl and Kolla Wellner of Sangaste, Estonia who had owned the chocolate factory Renomée in St Petersburg before the 1917 Russian Revolution. They launched their Tallinn business at 62, Müürivahe Street first as chocolate makers, later adding caramel, marmalade and candy to their assortment. As the brothers had already received much experience from their Petersburgian business, they produced high-quality sweets that were in demand both at home and in foreign markets. They began to export their production in 1925. To stay competitive, the enterprise was extended and modernized continuously - new buildings were erected, equipment renewed, new shops opened in Tallinn, Tartu and other Estonian towns. As export increased, trade agencies were opened in London, New York, Stockholm, Riga, Paris, Montreal, Casablanca and Cape Town. The Kawe sweets were especially popular in Sweden, England and the USA. In the late 1930s, Kawe employed nearly 500 people and its production represented 43% of the whole Estonian confectionery production.

==== Ginovker ====
The Ginovkers' family business, initially called Orjol, started in Tallinn at 6, Laulupeo Street in 1906. A small workshop at start with only a couple of workers, it evolved into a considerable business in the early 1920s. They also began to make biscuits and cookies. From 1929, chocolate sweets were produced at the Chocolate and Biscuit Confectionery Ginovker & Ko. By the early 1930s Ginovker had become the main biscuit producer in Estonia with an extensive assortment. The best known sweets were toffees and caramel candy Vähjad (Crawfish) and Barbarissi-segu (Barberry mix). Candy jars were popular containing candies filled with liqueur, peppermint and monpansjee (a local name for fruit drops). Biscuits were tea-, milk-, cocoa-, and chocolate- flavored. The Ginovkers’ production was exported to Europe, South-Asia, Middle East and elsewhere. 250 people were employed by the company.

==== Brandmann ====
August Brandmann's Confectionery was established at 4, Väike-Tartu Road in 1901 with only four workers. Success came quickly and in 1913, the Grand Prix was brought home from an international exhibition in Rome. In 1933, the company moved its premises to 27-29 Sakala street in Tallinn and in 1936, the son of August, Elmar, took over the management of the company. British educated, Elmar made of Brandmann one of the most innovative Estonian chocolate makers. Brandmann's Confectionary was the first enterprise in Estonia to produce cocoa powder and cocoa butter, The business employed 165 people by the end of 1939.

==== Klausson ====
Rudolf Klausson's Confectionery was established in 1920 and some years later it worked at 1, Toomvaestekool Street in Tallinn. In 1930 the assortment included over 30 kinds of fruit drops and lozenges, chocolate and biscuits. In 1927 coffee making was launched. In 1927 the Klausson's Confectionery was awarded the grand prix of the Tallinn fair- the gold medal.

==== Riola ====
Robert Weinreich founded Riola (initially called Chocolate Confectionery Gloria) in 1922. When the business went bankrupt in 1927, AS Robert Holst & Ko acquired Riola. The peak period of Riola was in 1937/38 when the business bought a large building at 150, Pärnu Road. The factory had modern equipment and employed 124 people. Riola produced fruit drops, lozenges, caramel, dragée and chocolate in bars and sweets. A big part of the production (especially caramel) went for export to the US, South America, Canada, Africa, India, Palestine and several European countries.

=== The market (1918–1940) ===
When competition increased, advertising and design acquired and more importance. The shops became really attractive with their beautifully designed chocolate bars and boxes in variegated shapes and sizes, the many colored jars in spiral rows and single jars of sweet-smelling caramel. The atmosphere in these shops was quite special.

The firms representative shops were modern with glittering showcases and glass shelves. In 1936, Kawe opened a new shop in the building of the House-Owners Bank (Tallinna Majaomanike Pank) on Vabaduse (Freedom) Square. Meta Kelgo, the 1929 Estonian beauty queen, was the shop assistant there.

The interior of the luxurious Stude shop, the above-mentioned Maiasmokk Café, retained its initial design, but was emphasized with the distinguished design of the chocolate boxes and painted Marzipan figures.

Product design was considered important. The design of chocolate boxes and bars as well as advertising, give us a good idea of the past fashions, tastes and changing styles. We can witness the changes of styles beginning from the eclectic Juugend (local term for Art Nouveau from the German Jugendstil) and shifting to Art Deco that suited the then urban mode of life.

People of all ages were fond of sweets. Thus the market and various buyers determined a rather wide scope of topics for the design. Smaller kids were offered fairy-tale characters, older ones popular film stars like Shirley Temple or contemporary news items like the Canadian quintuplets. Along with the never- fading national romantic heroes, the modern Art Deco man and woman were represented. The topics were well planned like for example the Brandmann series, Vilsandi Birds, or People's Candy. There were humorous series like the Ermos lazybones or Brandmann's Max and Moorits, Society and European People, where the Russians were depicted with the Red Star and the Germans with the Swastika. World events were reflected — Brandmann, for example, made a chocolate bar dedicated to the 1940 Helsinki Olympic Games that were canceled due to the outbreak of World War II. The sweets had names like Princess, Ballerina, Mermaid, Cabaret, Boxing, Lazybones, Sultan, Haiti, Hummingbird, Max and Moorits, Youth, Kiss-kiss, Netti, Maie, Gita, Eve, Crawfish...

=== The Soviet era (1940–1991) ===
In 1940, all the existing confectionery businesses were nationalized.

Five enterprises—Efekt, Eelis, Endla, Soliid, and Ermos—were merged with Kawe. The merged enterprise continued to operate under the name Kawe until 1948. On 1 April 1948, the company was renamed Kalev Confectionery Factory.

Also, Riola, Stude and Brandmann were merged into a new confectionery company, Karamell. In 1958, a new company, Uus Kalev, opened a year earlier at 139, Pärnu Road, absorbed Karamell. In 1962, Uus Kalev and Kalev merged into what became known as the Kalev confectionery factory. During the Soviet period, Kalev produced sweets for Estonia and the whole of the former Soviet Union.

== Management ==
A private non-profit organization, the museum benefits from the support of the City of Tallinn's museums, the Estonian Ministry of Culture, the Estonian national archives and private collectors and enthusiasts. Admission is free.

== Gallery ==
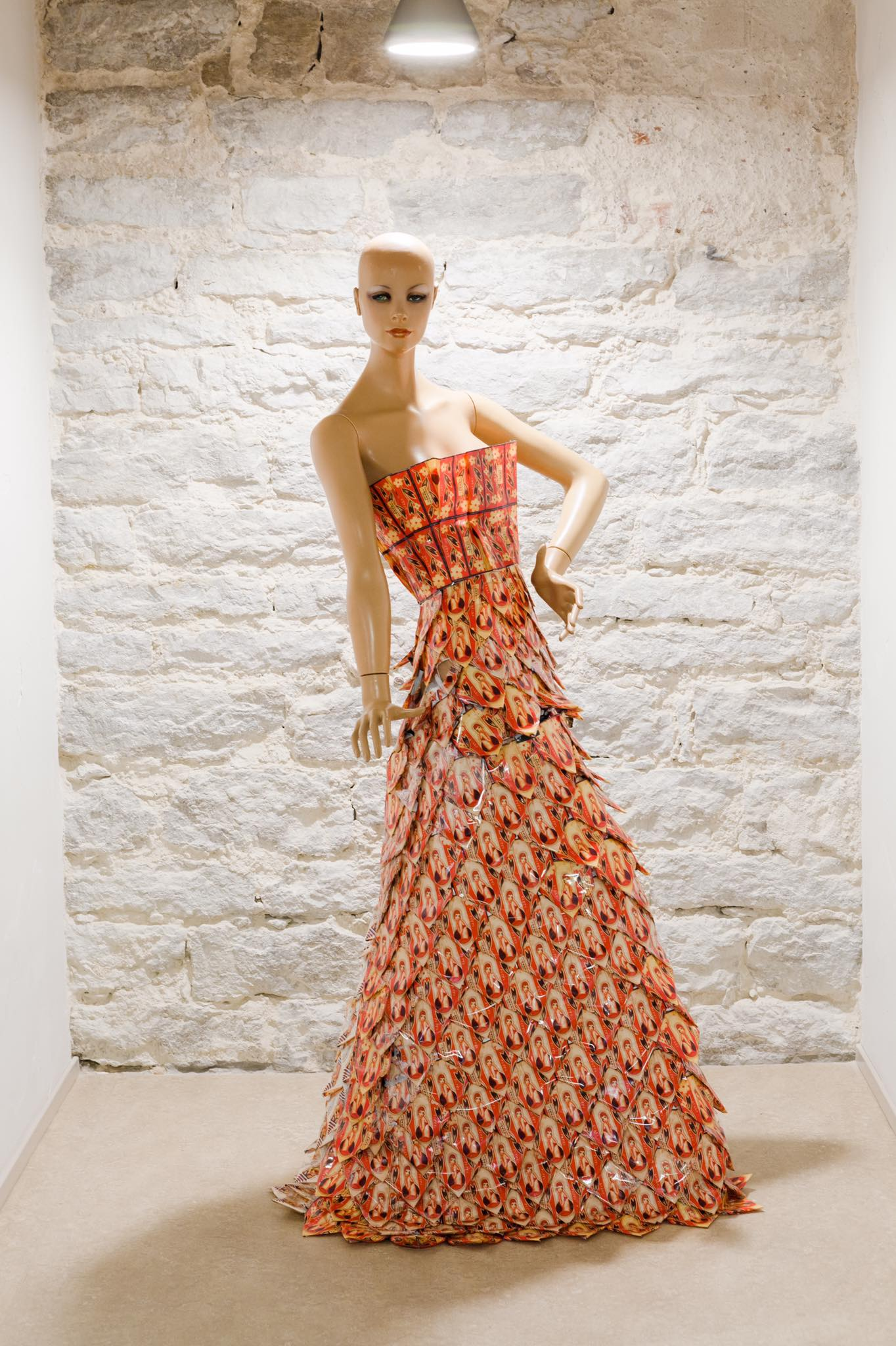
A dress composed with chocolate wrappings entirely

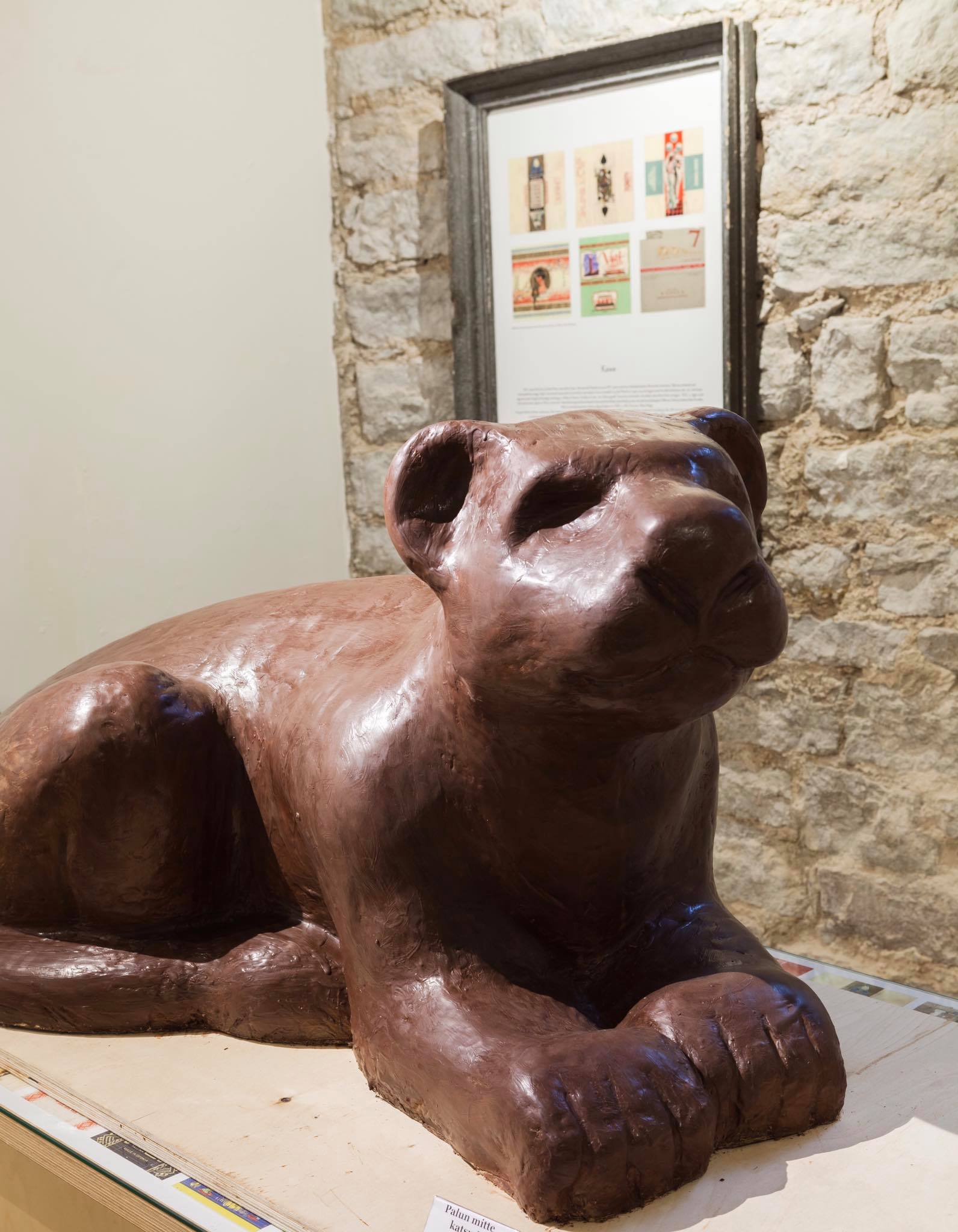
A large chocolate Sculpture inspired by a work of Simson von Seakyl

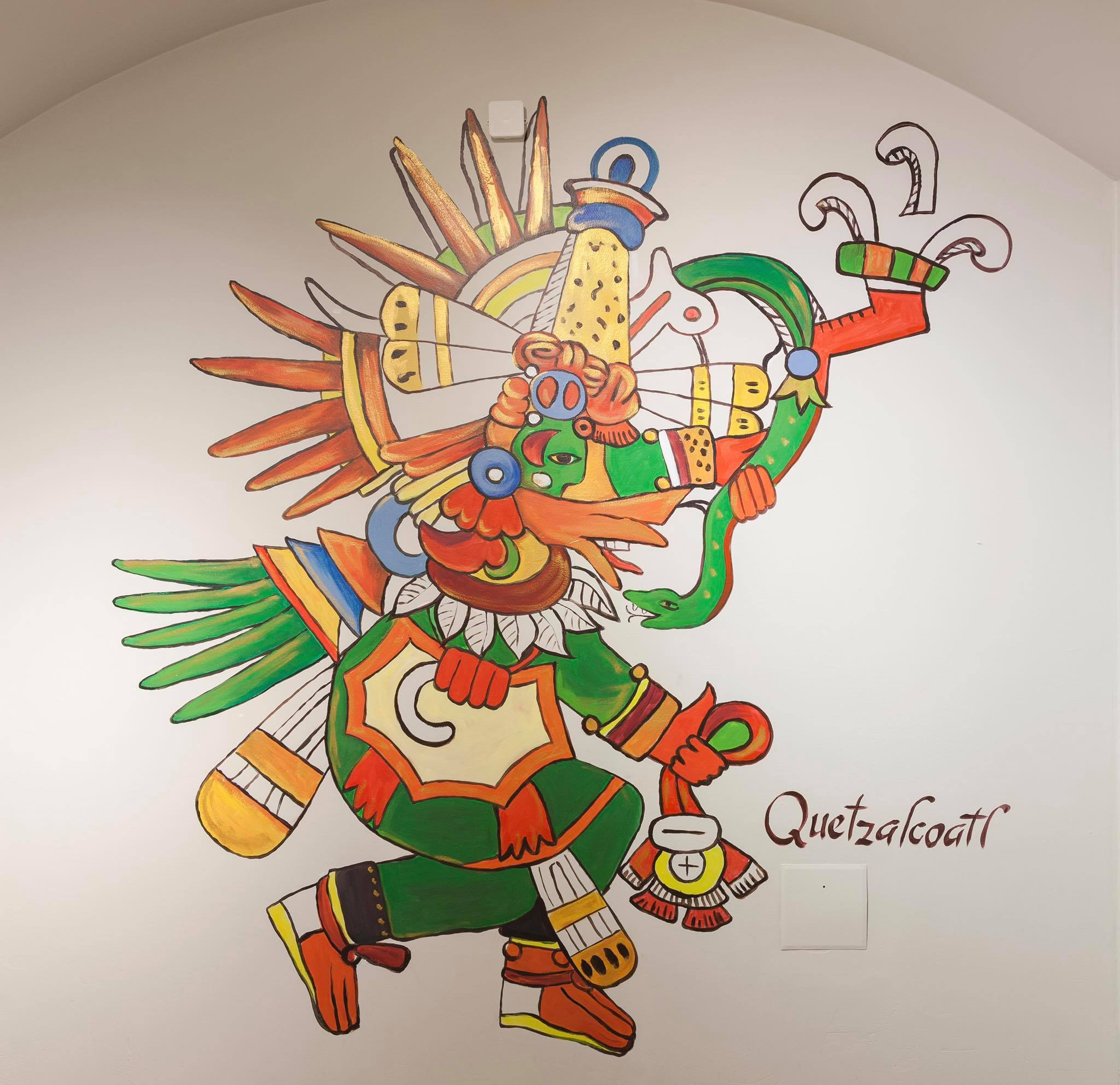
Quetzacoatl wall painting

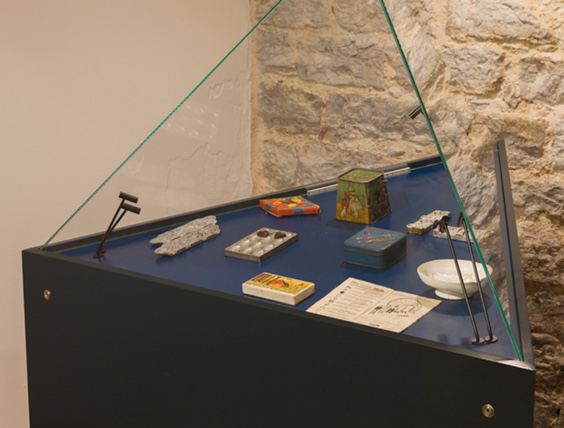
Molds, boxes and ads

== See also ==
- Estonian Museum of Applied Art and Design
