= Chocolat Jacques =

Belgian firm

Chocolat Jacques is a Belgian firm that was founded in Verviers in 1896, by Antoine Jacques (1858-1929). Production was later moved to Bruges and Eupen in the east of Belgium, where its headquarters have been located since 1923.

== History ==
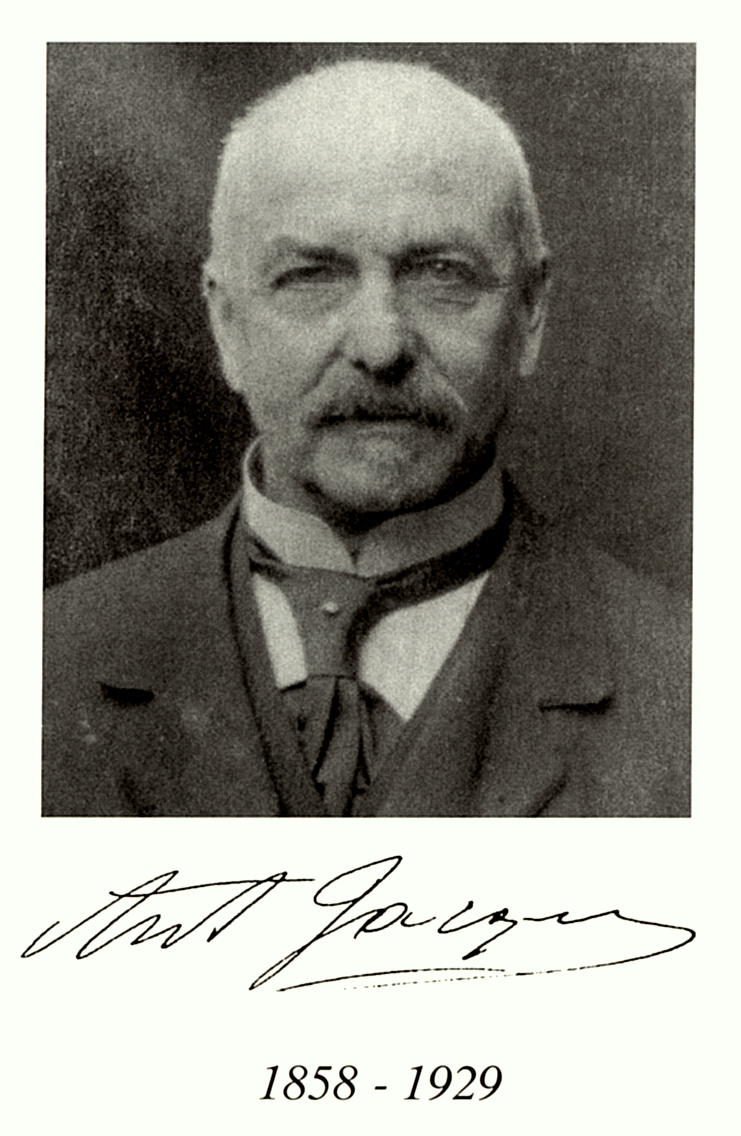
Antoine Jacques

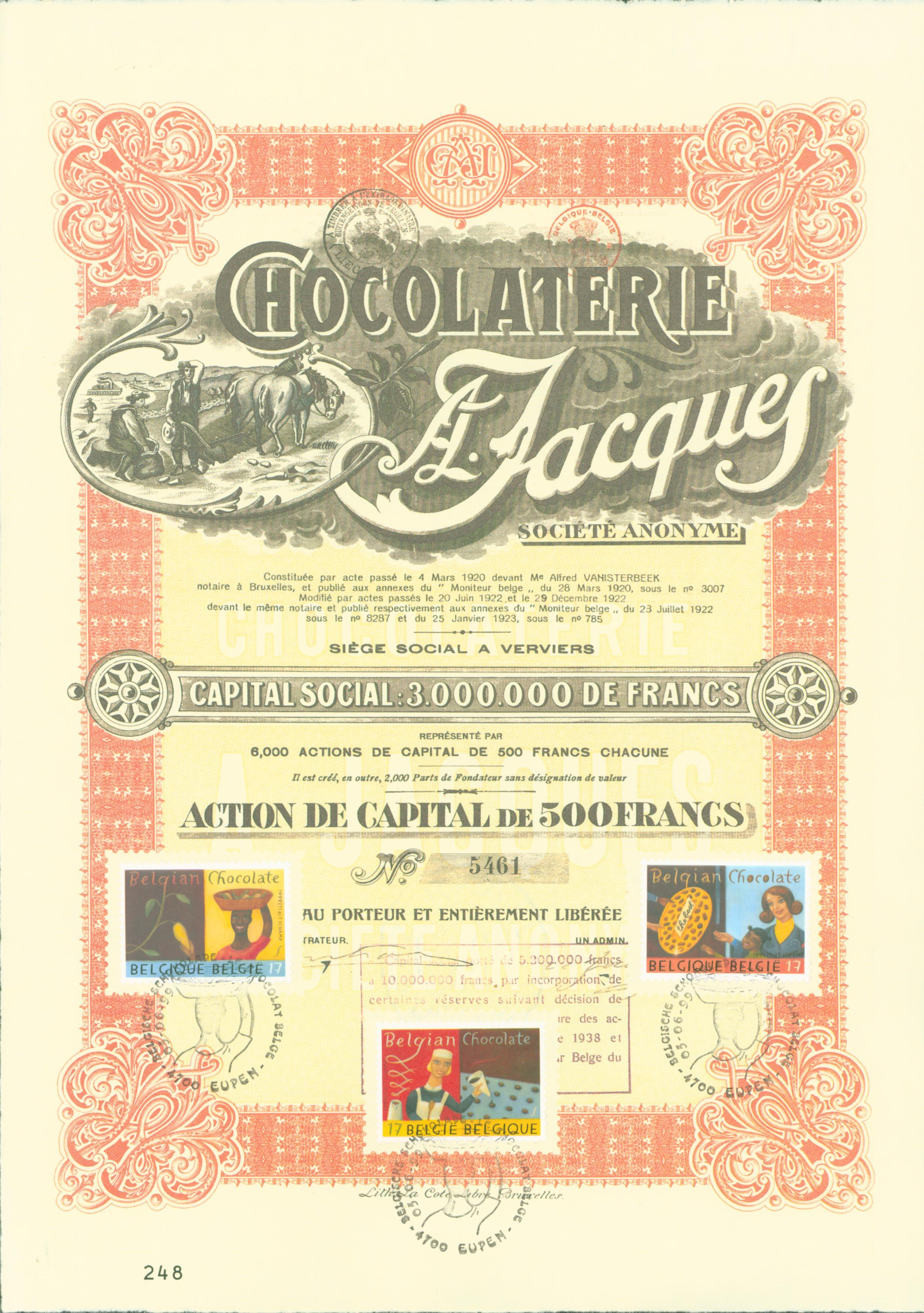
Share of the Chocolaterie A. Jacques S. A., issued 25 January 1923

In 1890, the trained confectioner Antoine Jacques, together with Jean Joseph Hardy, opened the first factory in Verviers under the name "Gingerbread Factory Hardy and Jacques, Verviers" and just one year later won a gold medal at the Liège Economic Exhibition. In 1894 they expanded their production to chocolate products and made this apparent in their new company name "Chocolate and gingerbread Hardy and Jacques, Verviers". In 1895, Jacques bought his first steam engine and parted ways with his partner Hardy a year later. From then on he ran his company for gingerbread, confectionery and chocolates alone with around 43 employees and was then known as "A. Jacques".

In 1899, a fire broke out in the factory, destroying much of the machinery, equipment and stock. By 1904, however, his products won several prizes at regional exhibitions in Antwerp, Brussels, Liège and at the World Exhibition in St. Louis. A little later he had to deal with an internal theft of confectionery products and as a result fired six employees. Due to these firings, there was rioting and a prolonged strike at the company in 1906, causing a temporary slump in sales. Two years later, on 18 February 1908, an environmental catastrophe made matters worse when, after snow melt and heavy rainfall, the Weser burst its banks and flooded large parts of the company. Finally, between 1914 and 1918, Jacques had to completely cease production due to the unrest during the First World War and, on 23 February 1919, he also lost his son who was intended as successor.

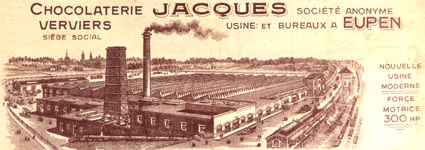
Chocolaterie Jacques in Verviers and Eupen

Chocolate consumption boomed again after the war and the business expanded. In 1920 he joined forces with William Zurstrassen from Verviers and from then on operated under the name "Chocolaterie A. Jacques Société Anonyme" (SA). Three years later he moved the business to Eupen and initially kept the Verviers factory as a branch. He gradually withdrew from the company and on 1 December 1923, he handed over his position as chairman of the board of directors. He sold the buildings in Verviers in March 1924 and resigned from his position as director of the company in June that year.

In 1931, the Chocolaterie created the first filled chocolate bar with their product "Noiseline", which they continued to refine and vary in the years that followed, and finally applied for a patent in 1936. This chocolate bar is composed of six different pieces that can be broken off, and it is still the most well-known product of the brand. It is made of chocolate milk with one of seven tastes: mocha and rum, banana, three fruits, praline 100, crispy praline, biscuit 100, and nuts. The last piece is black chocolate filled with melting cappuccino biscuits. Dubbed the "Superchocolate," it later became the company's best seller. A year later, the "Knight Jacques" was designed with a helmet, shield and spear on a rearing horse, which from then on adorned the company's logo on all of its own products.

The Second World War and the associated occupation by German Wehrmacht troops from 1940 to 1944 again brought great difficulties for the Chocolaterie. First, the company was confiscated by the German authorities and closed in 1942 due to a lack of stocks for production. In anticipation, the company management had transferred a large part of its supplies to a confectioner in Antwerp and had some of its products made by the de Beukelaer company, which was based there at the time, with the imprint “Chocolaterie Jacques Verviers”. After the occupiers left and the war ended, production in Eupen was resumed in 1945 and a year later the production facilities were extensively modernized and expanded.

In the following years, the turnover rose to 100 million Belgian francs by 1960. This was mainly due to the special bars, which were now available in 33 varieties with 21 flavours. From 1963, the bars were fitted with collectible pictures in the packaging and advertised with the sales label "one million bars a day". In 1966, the scrapbook with Pinocchio pictures published in the comic magazine Tintin, attracted particular positive attention. In addition, the Chocolaterie was successfully represented at international trade fairs such as Expo 58 in Brussels or confectionery fairs such as Anuga Food Fair in Cologne, the Berlin International Green Week and in Munich and Denmark.

Changes in the European market brought about new corporate strategies from the 1970s onwards. In 1976, for example, Chocolaterie Jacques first joined the distribution company "Continental Sweets Belgium" and in 1982 joined the Stollwerck Group from Cologne while retaining the brand name and logo. After the Stollwerck headquarters were given up in the early 1980s and the company concentrated more on promoting production in the affiliated companies, the Chocolaterie Jacques in Eupen also benefited from this and was initially able to move to a larger area in the nearby Eupen industrial area in 1987 of the motorway junction, where they had new buildings erected with more modern machines. As early as 1993, the building wings were expanded and, among other things, the in-house chocolate museum was set up. In 2001, Chocolaterie Jacques committed to using only cocoa butter and no vegetable fat for its products and received the “AMBAO label” from the Belgian Ministry of Economic Affairs.

Since the takeover of the Stollenwerck Group in 2002 by Barry Callebaut, the Zürich market leader in high-quality cocoa and chocolate products, Chocolaterie Jacques has also belonged to this company and has risen to number two behind the Côte d'Or brand on the Belgian market. Barry Callebaut started cooperating with the Spanish chocolate producer Natra in 2009, which also had an impact on the Eupen Chocolaterie. Jacques had to close the liquid chocolate department because it was decided the liquid chocolate would be stored at the Callebaut factory in Lebbeke and a Polish facility would process it. Finally, in 2011, Jacques was taken over with the entire Stollwerck Group by the Belgian confectionery manufacturer Baronie and from then on was traded as "Sweet Products Chocolate". In 2013, only around 30 employees and 100 workers were employed on just one production line.

On 23 October 2018, the works' council announced the closure of the Eupen plant scheduled for May 2019. At the end of April 2019, the final closure is scheduled for May 17. However, the brand continues to be produced in Bruges. The reason for this are declining sales and quality deficiencies since 2011. Around 60 to 70 employees were affected by the closure.

== Chromo pictures and albums ==
During much of the 20th century, the wrappers of "Jacques" chocolate bars contained collectible cards that could be stored in albums published by the factory. At first, they were just drawings, but afterwards there were even photos. The themes of the albums were various, for example about transport (trains or cars), the Belgian royal family, Belgian Congo, or Belgian geography.

There are still many collectors of these old Jacques cards and albums today.

== Factory visits and museum ==
In October 1993, just one year after the Schokoladenmuseum Köln was opened by the majority owner of Stollwerck AG, Hans Imhoff, a chocolate museum was set up on the premises of the Stollwerck subsidiary Jacques in Eupen. In addition to the historical presentation of cocoa cultivation and chocolate production in the form of documentation and video presentations, there was a large collection that provided a comprehensive insight into the entire product range from the beginnings to the present, as well as old and partly historical moulds, production machines and chocolate machines, colour and collectible pictures, advertising posters and valuable porcelain from the 18th and 19th centuries. An adjoining sales shop provided samples of the current Jacques range and other products from the company. Visitors could walk over the production space on a footbridge to see the pastry cooks working without bothering them. The Eupen factory and the museum were closed down in January 2019. The traditional name and products remain.

== Products (selection) ==
- Matinettes – three types of chocolate bars as bread toppings
- Hagelslag – three types of chocolate sprinkles
- Seven types of filled chocolate bars
- Three types of chocolate bars
- Block chocolate for the preparation of mousse and chocolate milk
- Two types of chocolate drops for the preparation of sauces, mousse, dessert, ice cream and milk

=== Previous products (selection) ===
- Chocolat Le Semeur – 1904
- Chocolat de la Gileppe – 1905
- Délice de 4 Cantons – 1907
- Le Chocolat des Coopérateurs – 1921
- Notre Marianne – 1921
- Le Chocolat de la Clairière et la Semeuse – 1921
- Noiseline – 1931, first bar-shaped brand
- Mokaline – in 10 variations, registered in 1934
- Superchocolat – six piece chocolate bar 1936
- Fruidine – chocolate bar with frozen fruit, registered in 1936
- Moka Rhum – several variations with rum ingredients
- Royal Jacques – chocolate bar in several variations, registered 1938
- Fourré Praliné
- Luna – chocolate bar, 1950s
- Elysee – chocolate bar, registered 1959

== Literature ==
- Charles Pirard: Fabrique de Chocolat A. Jacques
