= Republic of Chocolate =

Museum in Bade, Taoyuan City, Taiwan

- 巧克力共和國
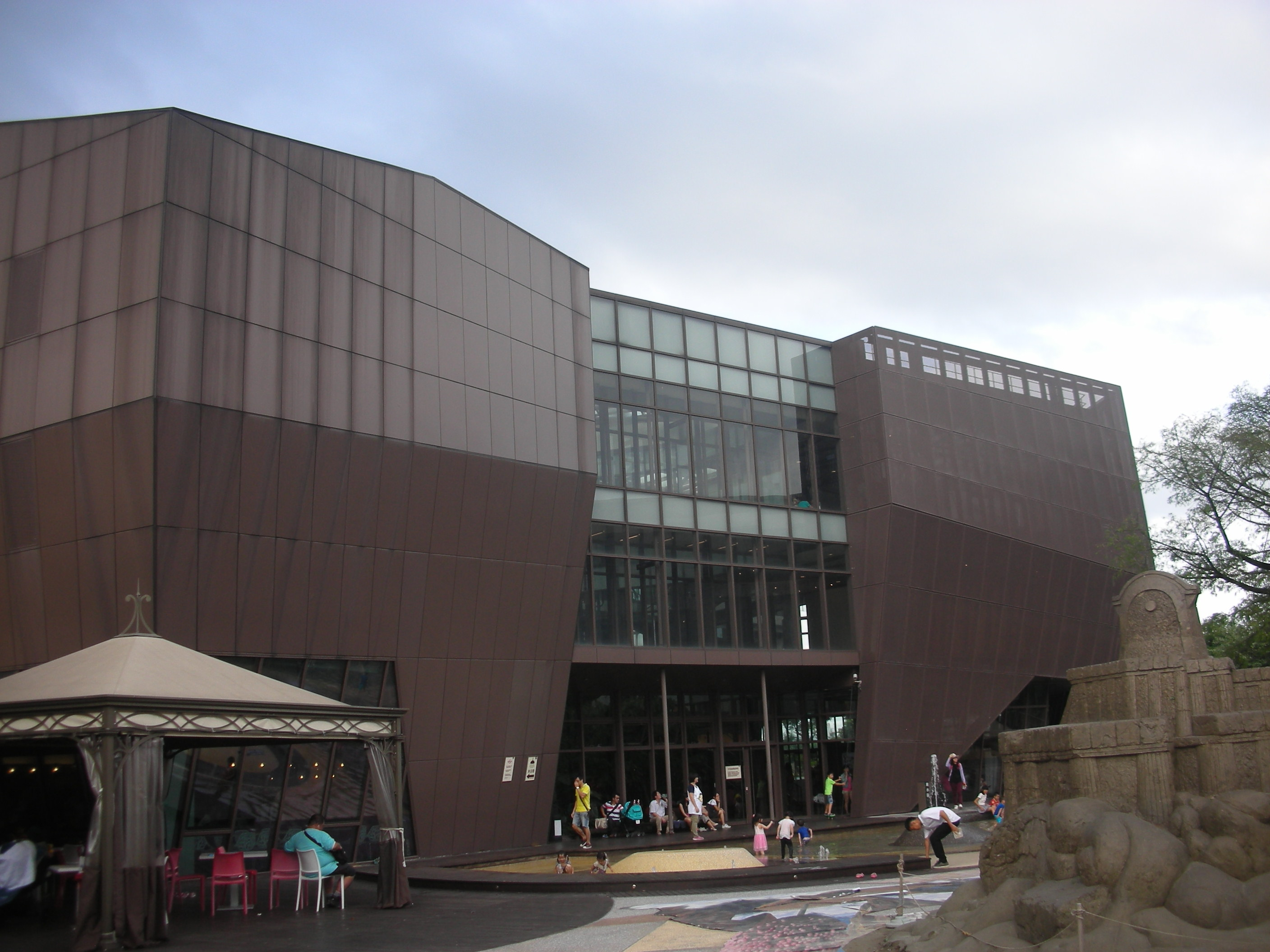
- Established: 2012
- Location: Bade, Taoyuan City, Taiwan
- Coordinates: 24°56′31.1″N 121°17′25.7″E
- Type: museum
- Owner: Hunya Food Corporation
- Website: Official website

The Republic of Chocolate (traditional Chinese: 巧克力共和國; simplified Chinese: 巧克力共和国; pinyin: Qiǎokèlì Gònghéguó) or Hungya Chocolate Museum is a museum about chocolate in Bade District, Taoyuan City, Taiwan.

== History ==
The museum was established in 2012.

== Architecture ==
The museum was built with a shape of chocolate of a 3-story building. It features a greenhouse, exhibition hall, chocolate making class, restaurant and factory tours.

== See also ==
- List of museums in Taiwan
