= Musée "Les secrets du chocolat" =

Museum in Geispolsheim, France

Strasbourg Chocolate Museum
- Musée "Les secrets du chocolat"
- Location within France
- Location: Geispolsheim, France
- Coordinates: 48.5209°N 7.6983°E
- Website: www.musee-du-chocolat.com/index-en.php

The Musée "Les secrets du chocolat" ("Museum of Chocolate Secrets") is a museum in Geispolsheim, France, devoted to the subject of chocolate.

The museum is about 10 minutes from downtown Strasbourg. The museum is entered through a small courtyard with storefronts that copy the style of Paris in the day of the Marquise de Sévigné. There are various areas that explore different themes, a demonstration workshop, a conference room where seminars can be held and a restaurant. The exhibits and media describe the history of use of cocoa beans, starting with the Aztecs. It describes the process of making chocolate, and describes who the Marquise de Sévigné was and how she was connected with the Marquise de Sévigné brand of chocolate. Children aged 5–12 can learn in the discovery workshop.
