= Choco-Story Brussels =

Museum of chocolate and cocoa in Brussels, Belgium

- Interactive fullscreen map
- Former name: Museum of Cocoa and Chocolate
- Established: 1998; 28 years ago
- Location: Rue de l'Étuve / Stoofstraat 41, 1000 City of Brussels, Brussels-Capital Region, Belgium
- Type: Food museum
- Director: Peggy Van Lierde
- Website: choco-story-brussels.be/en

Choco-Story Brussels, formerly known as the Museum of Cocoa and Chocolate (French: Musée du cacao et du chocolat; Dutch: Museum van cacao en chocolade), is a privately owned museum in central Brussels, Belgium, dedicated to chocolate and cocoa products. It was established in 1998 at the initiative of Gabrielle Draps, the wife of the chocolate artisan Joseph "Jo" Draps, founder of Godiva Chocolatier. The museum provides demonstrations and tastings, and visitors can book a workshop to make chocolate bars and lollipops.

== History ==
The Museum of Cocoa and Chocolate (French: Musée du cacao et du chocolat, Dutch: Museum van cacao en chocolade) was founded in July 1998 on the initiative of Gabrielle Draps, who represented the third generation of chocolate artisans and was married to the founder of the Godiva chocolate manufacturer, Joseph "Jo" Draps. The museum was originally housed in a house dating from 1697, formerly called the De Valck building, located at 9–11, rue de la Tête d'or/Guldenhoofdstraat, just off the Grand-Place/Grote Markt (Brussels' main square). It spanned three exhibition floors.

The museum's management was taken over by Gabrielle Draps' daughter, Peggy van Lierde, in 2007. In May 2014, the museum was renamed "Choco-Story Brussels" following the association of the Van Lierde-Draps family with the Van Belle family, already owner of Choco-Story Bruges, the Bruges Chocolate Museum. In 2019, the museum moved to a new building with 1,800 m^{2} (19,000 sq ft) of exhibition space, located at 41, rue de l'Étuve/Stoofstraat, near Manneken Pis. In 2021, the Van Belle family applied for permission to convert the museum's former building on the Rue de la Tête d'Or into a museum of French fries.

== Gallery ==
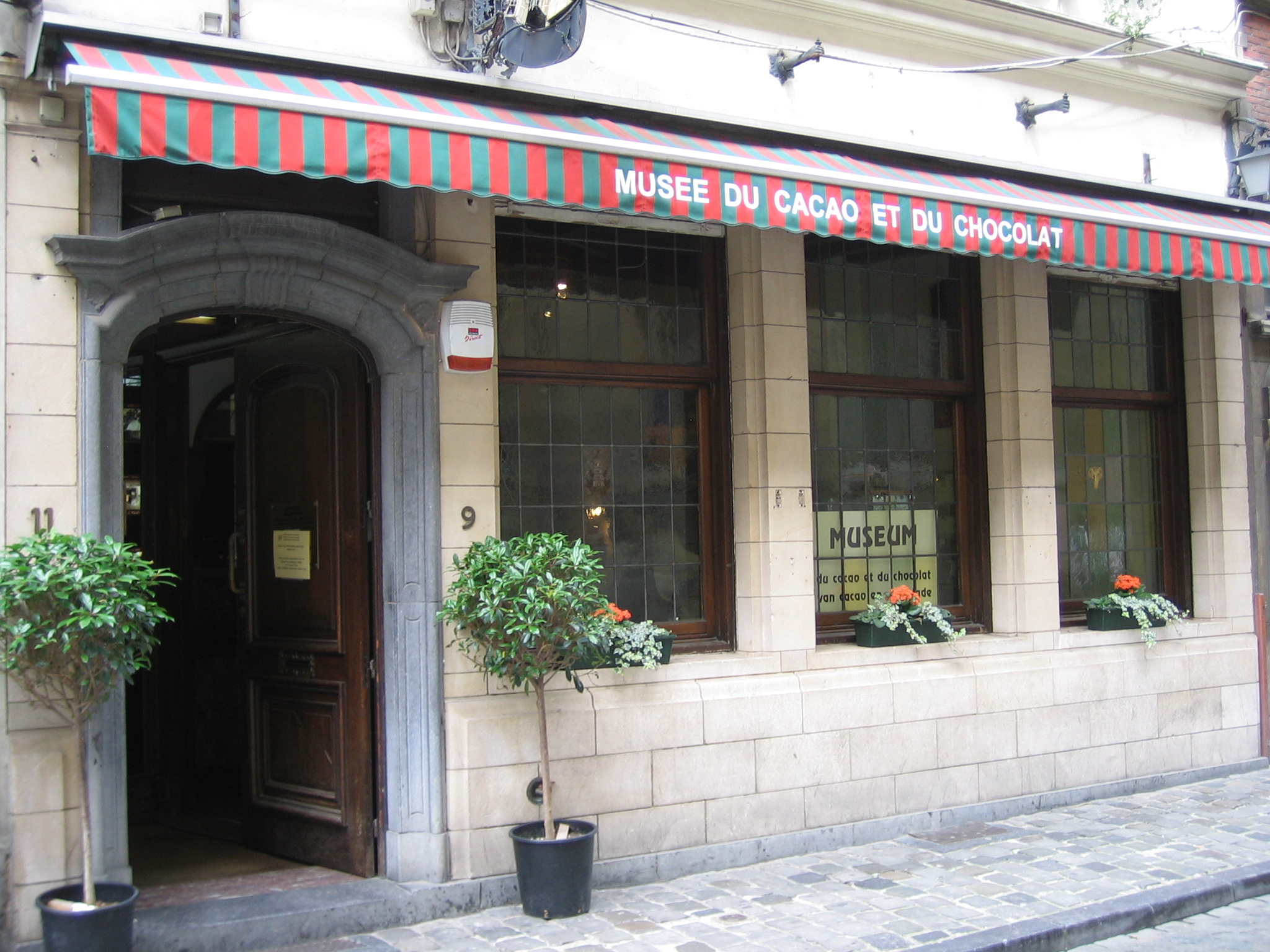
Facade of the De Valck building, the museum's former home

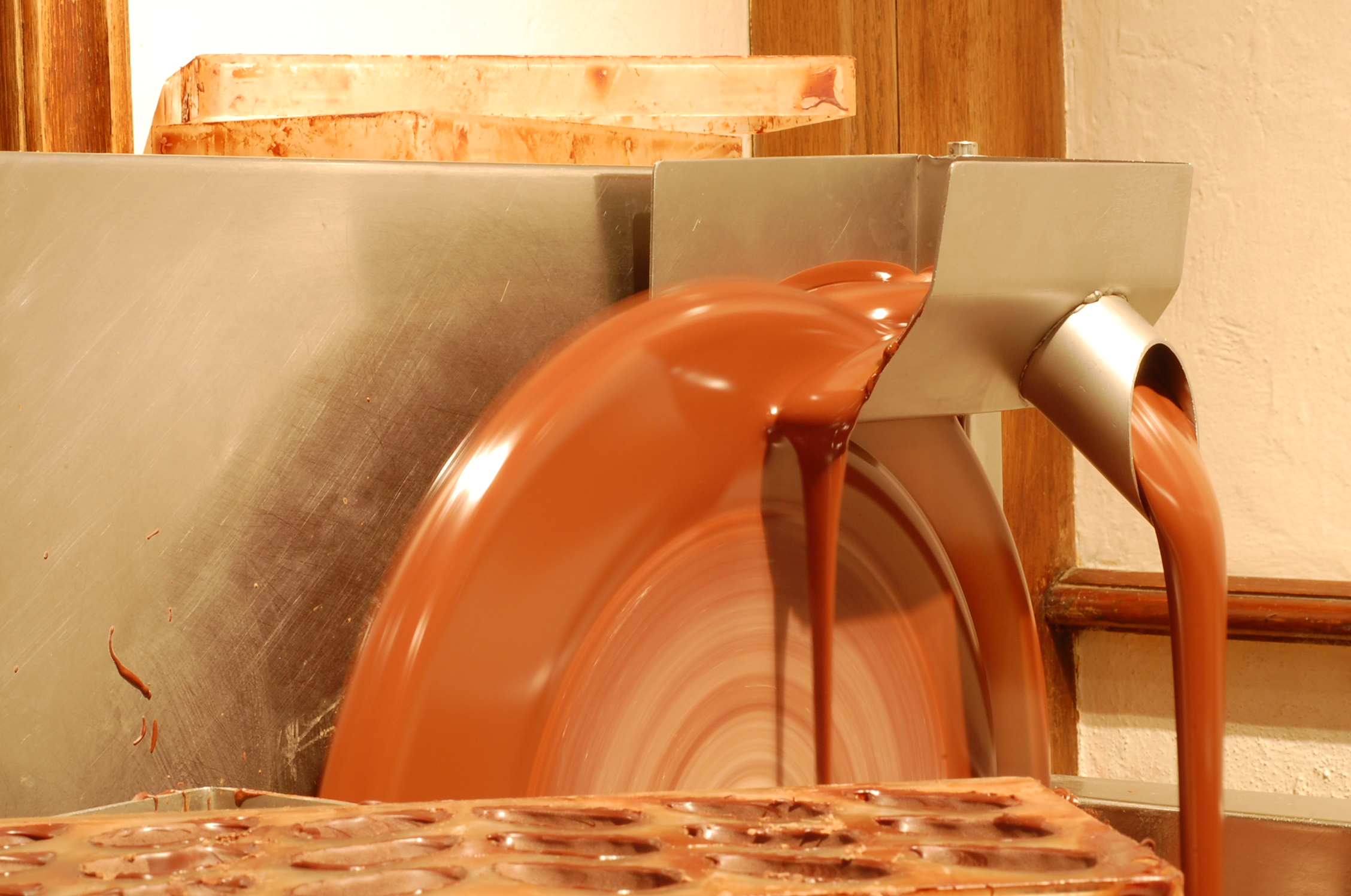
Chocolate tempering machine

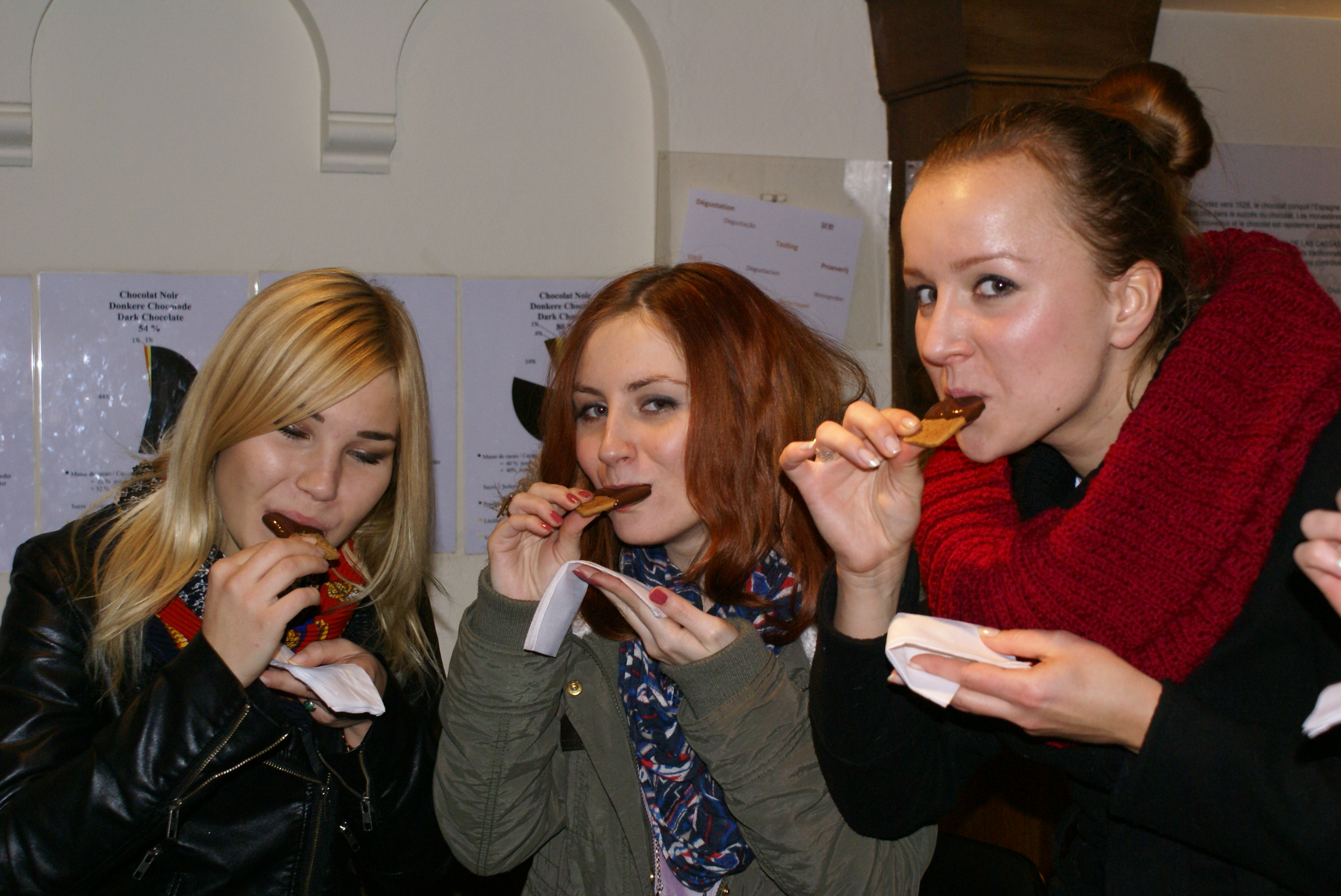
Tasting the chocolate

== See also ==
- List of museums in Brussels
- History of Brussels
- Culture of Belgium
