= Choco-Story Brugge =

Museum in Bruges, Belgium

Coordinates: 51°12′38″N 3°13′34″E

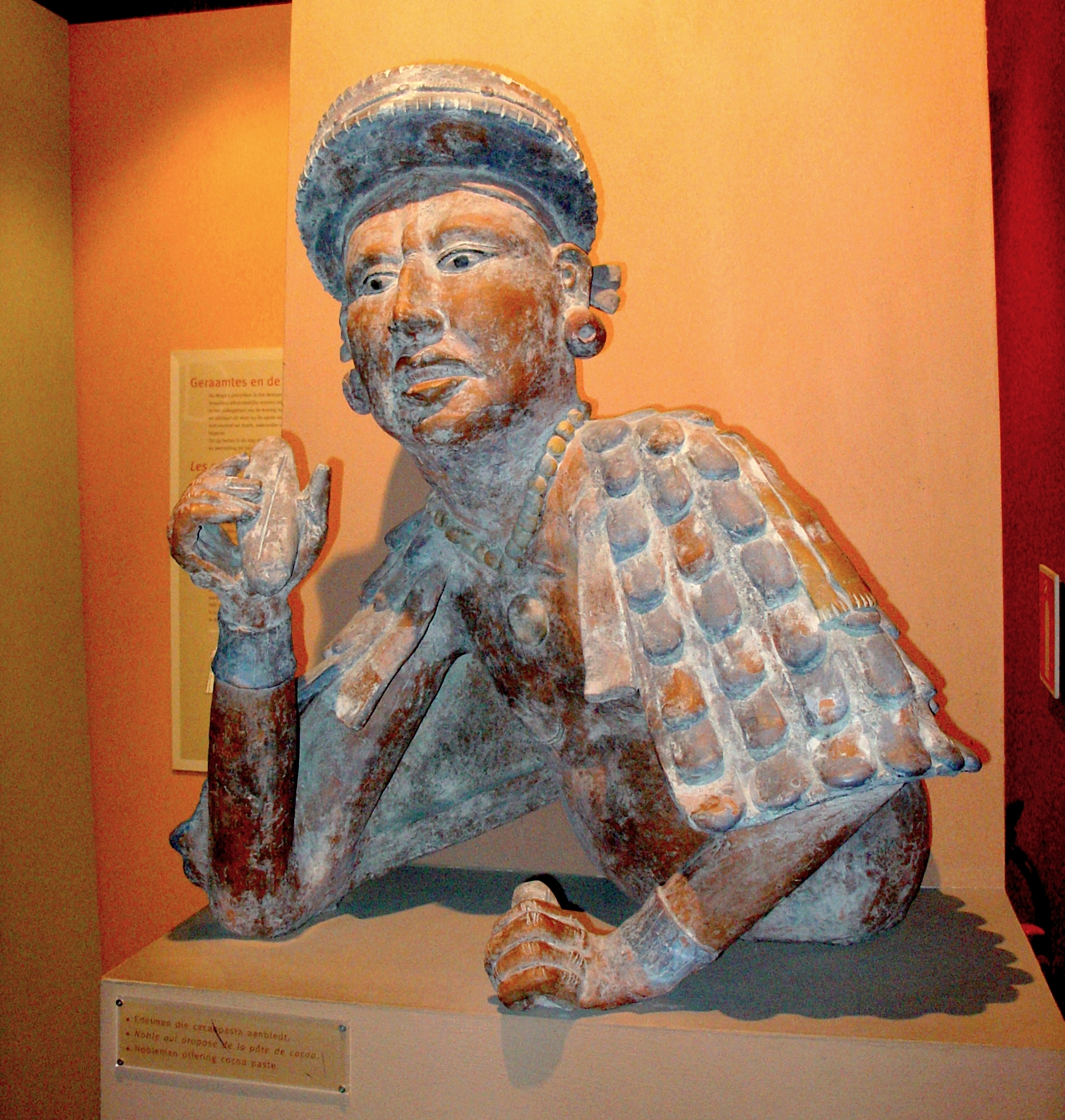
Mayan nobleman with cacao paste, in the Choco-Story museum

Choco-Story, the Chocolate Museum in Bruges, Belgium, is located in the sixteenth-century "Huis de Crone" building on Sint-Jansplein (at the intersection of Wijnzakstraat and Sint-Jansstraat) in central Bruges. This building was originally the home of a wine tavern. It later housed a bakery and, most recently, a furniture making shop.

Choco-Story was opened by Eddy Van Belle and his son, Cédric. The two are also the owners of Belcolade, a family-owned chocolate business.

Museum visitors can watch chocolate being made.

Additionally, a section of the museum is dedicated to the health benefits of chocolate.

== See also ==
- List of food and beverage museums
