= Scho-Ka-Kola =

German chocolate brand containing coffee and kola nut

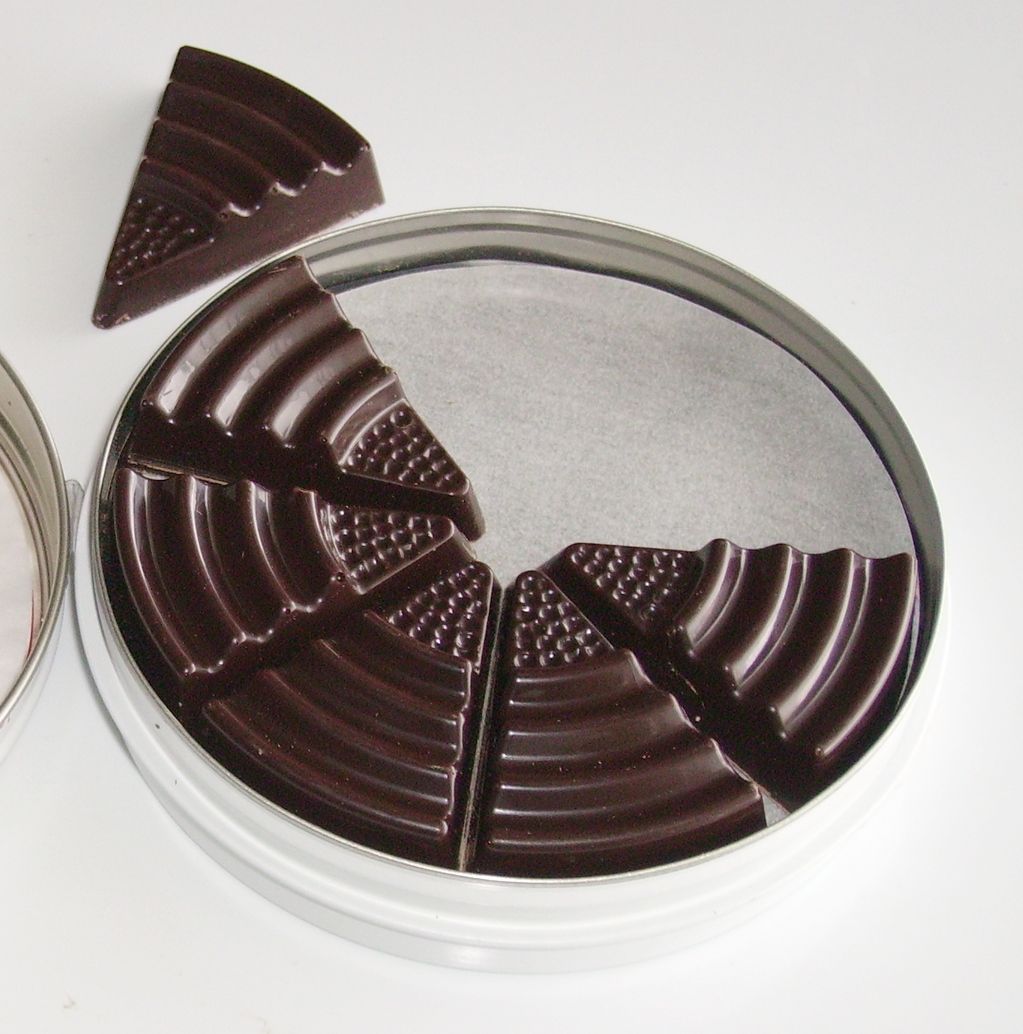
- Scho-Ka-Kola canister
- Product type: Confectionery
- Current owner: Scho-Ka-Kola GmbH
- Country: Nazi Germany
- Introduced: 1936
- Markets: Germany
- Website: scho-ka-kola.de

Scho-Ka-Kola is a German brand of chocolate consumed for its strong caffeine and kola nut mix. Launched in 1936 during the Nazi era, the chocolates have a caffeine content of about 0.2 percent, which is derived from the cocoa content of 58 percent and the addition of 2.6 percent roast coffee and 1.6 percent kola nut. The chocolate is divided into wedges held in a round metal canister. The red-and-white container design and recipe have changed very little since its original launch.

== History ==
Scho-Ka-Kola (for Schokolade–Kaffee–Kolanuss) was created in 1935 and patented by the Hildebrand, Kakao- und Schokoladenfabrik manufacturer, established by chocolatier Theodor Hildebrand (1791-1872) in Alt-Berlin. It was introduced at the 1936 Summer Olympics as a performance-enhancing energy "Sport Chocolate" (German: Sportschokolade). It was also produced by the chocolate manufacturer B. Sprengel & Co. in Hannover, who in 1936 was recognized as an important pre-war economy operation, as well as produced by other German chocolate manufacturers.

=== World War II ===
In World War II, Scho-Ka-Kola was colloquially known as the "Aviator Chocolate" (German: Fliegerschokolade), as it was commonly provided with Luftwaffe pilot and crew rations to induce or extend wakefulness and alertness, especially on night-bombing missions, and was also issued to flight crews in blue canisters as emergency sea-survival rations (German: Seenotpackung).

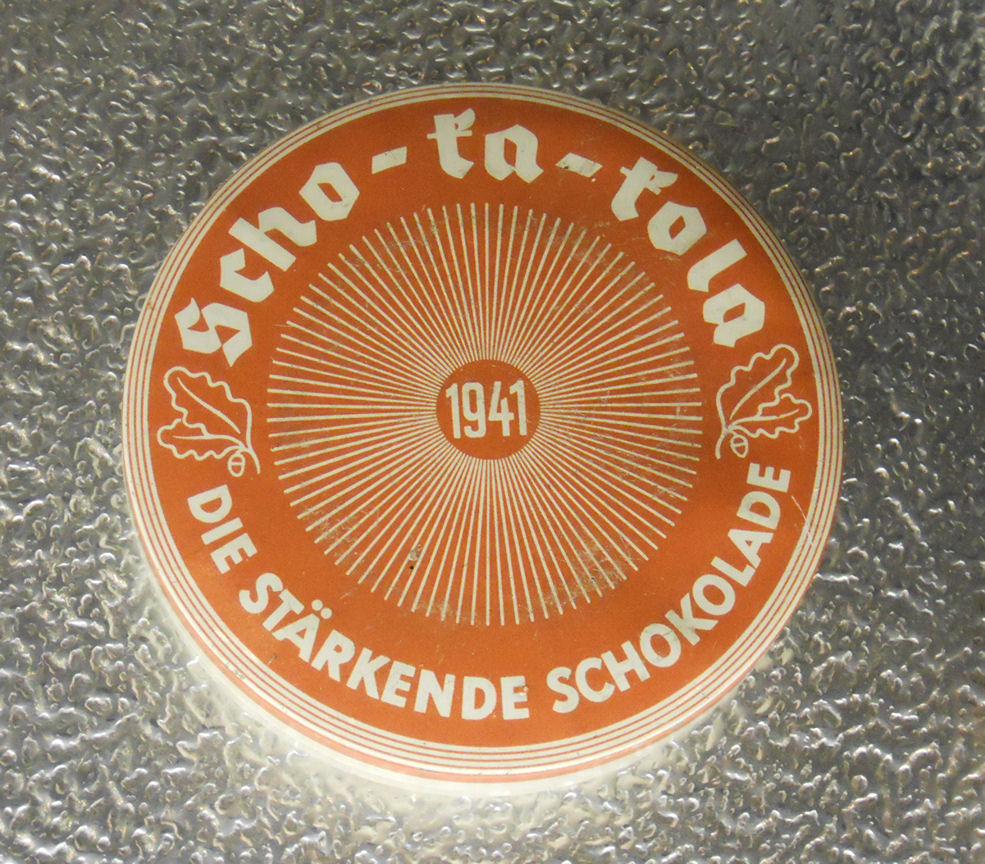
Original retail canister in 1941, Scho-ka-kola printed in Fraktur calligraphy

Scho-Ka-Kola was also issued during World War II to German tank crews, U-boat crews, and the German Army. During the occupation period it was also distributed to the German population by the Allies. German Wehrmacht-issue Scho-Ka-Kola were designated "Wehrmacht-Packung" on the container underside, issued in either the metal tin or cardboard container version.

Scho-Ka-Kola is mentioned three times in Johann Voss's World War II autobiography, Black Edelweiss. "Johann Voss", real name unknown, joins the Waffen-SS in 1943 at only 17. He ends up in Northern Finland as an SS mountain trooper in the 6th SS Mountain Division Nord and participates in heavy fighting against the Soviet Union. When things go particularly bad, round tin boxes of Scho-Ka-Kola are issued to the troops. He also claims that during Operation Northwind (particularly, the town of Reipertswiller, France, 16 January 1945 – 20 January 1945, in which Voss participated in a German victory), Scho-Ka-Kola was given to captured American troops as an act of respect for their bravery. Voss details Scho-Ka-Kola in the footnotes, calling the chocolate "pure luxury" and explains that each round tin contains two discs of dark chocolate, laced with caffeine from coffee beans.

== Production ownership ==
In 1969, German chocolate producer Hans Imhoff took over the Hildebrand chocolate company, and in 1972 also bought the beleaguered Stollwerck chocolate manufacturer from Deutsche Bank for distribution. On 1 July 2005, the German Genuport company gained all brand and distribution rights to the product. Currently it is made by a subsidiary in Berlin and available across Germany and distributed in a limited number of foreign countries.

== Ingredients ==
Cocoa mass (also known as cocoa solids), sugar, cocoa butter, coffee (2.6%), whole milk powder, kola nut powder (1.6%), soy lecithin (emulsifier), E476 (emulsifier), flavor. May contain traces of hazelnuts, almonds and gluten.

== US trademark dispute ==
On 1 May 1998, a United States federal trademark registration was filed for SCHO-KA-KOLA by Waldbaur GmbH. The United States Patent and Trademark Office had given the SCHO-KA-KOLA trademark serial number 75477887. The current federal status of this trademark filing is abandoned after an inter-partes decision on 18 October 2001; The Coca-Cola Company filed the dispute for the trademark in proceeding number 91116244.
