= Hans Imhoff =

German businessman and chocolatier (1922–2007)

Hans Imhoff (March 12, 1922 – December 21, 2007) was a German chocolate producer and founder of the Imhoff-Schokoladenmuseum (English: Imhoff Chocolate Museum, nowadays: Schokoladenmuseum Köln, English: Chocolate Museum Cologne) in Cologne, Germany.

Imhoff was born in Cologne to Franz and Charotte Imhoff (née Gallé). After leaving Elementary School he then joined a Trade School, where he trained in Commercial and Vocational Studies. Imhoff founded a chocolate and sugar factory after World War II where he produced non-branded chocolates, which became very successful. In 1969 he took over the Hildebrand chocolate company in Berlin – Germany's oldest chocolate manufacturer - who held the chocolate brand "Scho-Ka-Kola". In 1972 Imhoff took over the failing Stollwerck chocolate company, and managed to convert it into a successful business. He built up a European Chocolate group through acquiring other brands such as Sprengel and Sarotti. Imhoff retired from the company in 2002.

In 1993 Imhoff opened the Imhoff-Schokoladenmuseum (Imhoff Chocolate Museum) in Cologne which creates around 650,000 visitors per year. In 2001 the city of Cologne gave Imhoff an honorary citizenship.

Imhoff was married to Clare Gerburg Schmitt, with whom he had four children. He died on 21 December 2007 (aged 85) of an infection caused by lung inflammation.

== Titles ==
- Honorary consul of Togo
- 2001 honorary citizenship, of Cologne

== Literature ==
- Claus Jacobi: Der Schokoladenkönig. Das unglaubliche Leben des Hans Imhoff. Langen Müller, München 1997, ISBN 3-7844-2650-6 (German)
