= Tauzieher =

Coordinates: 50.93209°N 6.963274°E

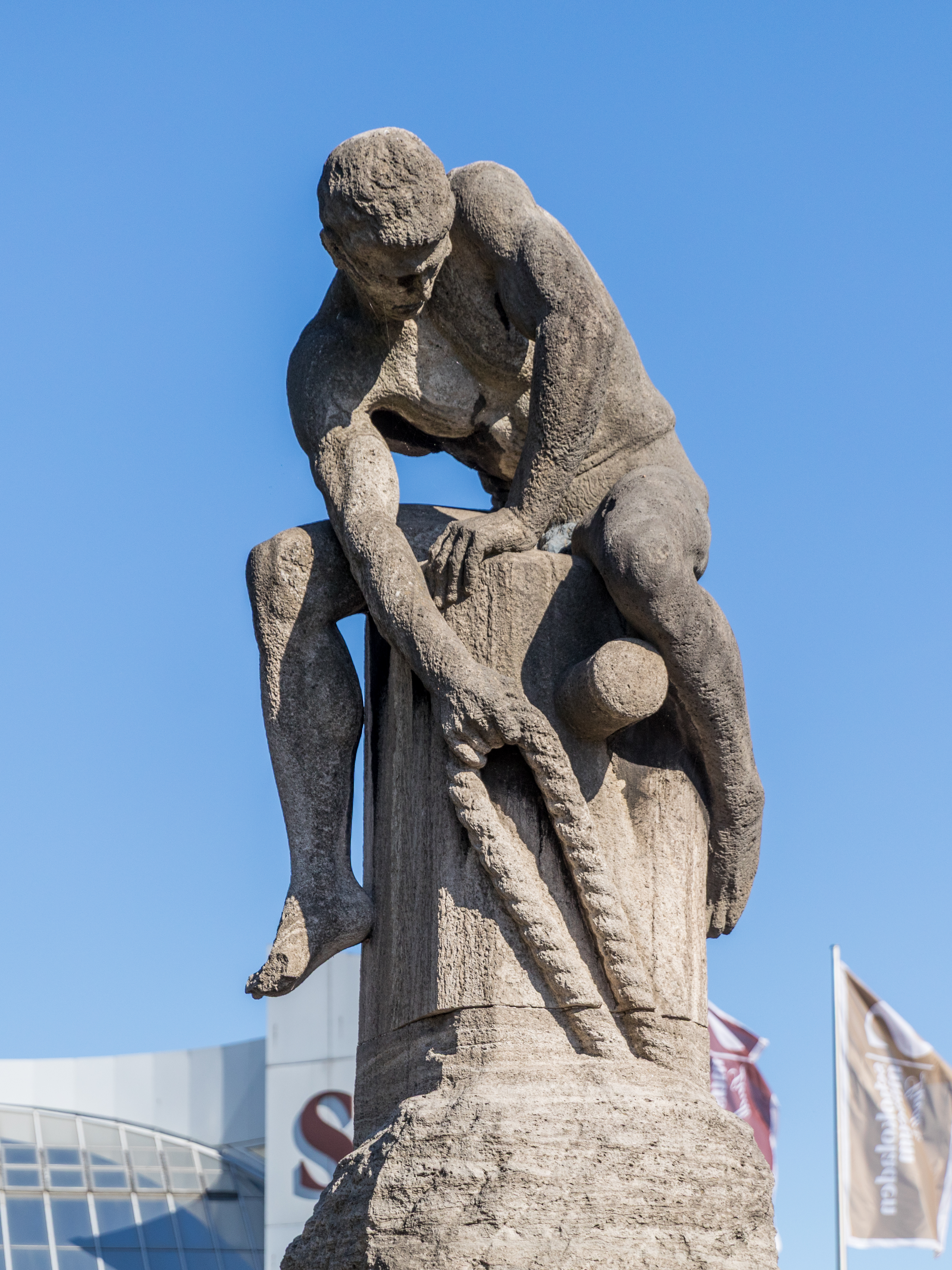
- Artist: Nikolaus Friedrich
- Location: Rheinauhafen, Cologne, Germany

The Tauzieher (German for "rope puller") is a limestone sculpture by Nikolaus Friedrich which was erected in 1911 in Rheinauhafen, Cologne. It depicts a man making a heavy rope or hawser fast to a bollard and is 6.5 metres (21 feet) in height. In 1980, it was listed as one of the first heritage sites in Cologne.

== History ==
Nikolaus Friedrich was a German sculptor, born in Cologne and working in Charlottenburg. In the 1908 art show of the Association of Cologne Artists at the Flora und Botanischer Garten Köln, he exhibited a sculpted male figure that excited considerable admiration in art circles. A plan was devised to install a version of the work, about twice the size of the original, on an appropriate site in the city. The Cologne friends of the arts took up a collection and when the amount collected was insufficient, the city pledged the remainder. The chosen location was a vacant piece of ground next to the timber market, opposite the new harbour. Erection of the scaffolding began on 21 September 1910. The statue was unveiled on 4 March 1911. It was the first free-standing sculpture in public space in Cologne.

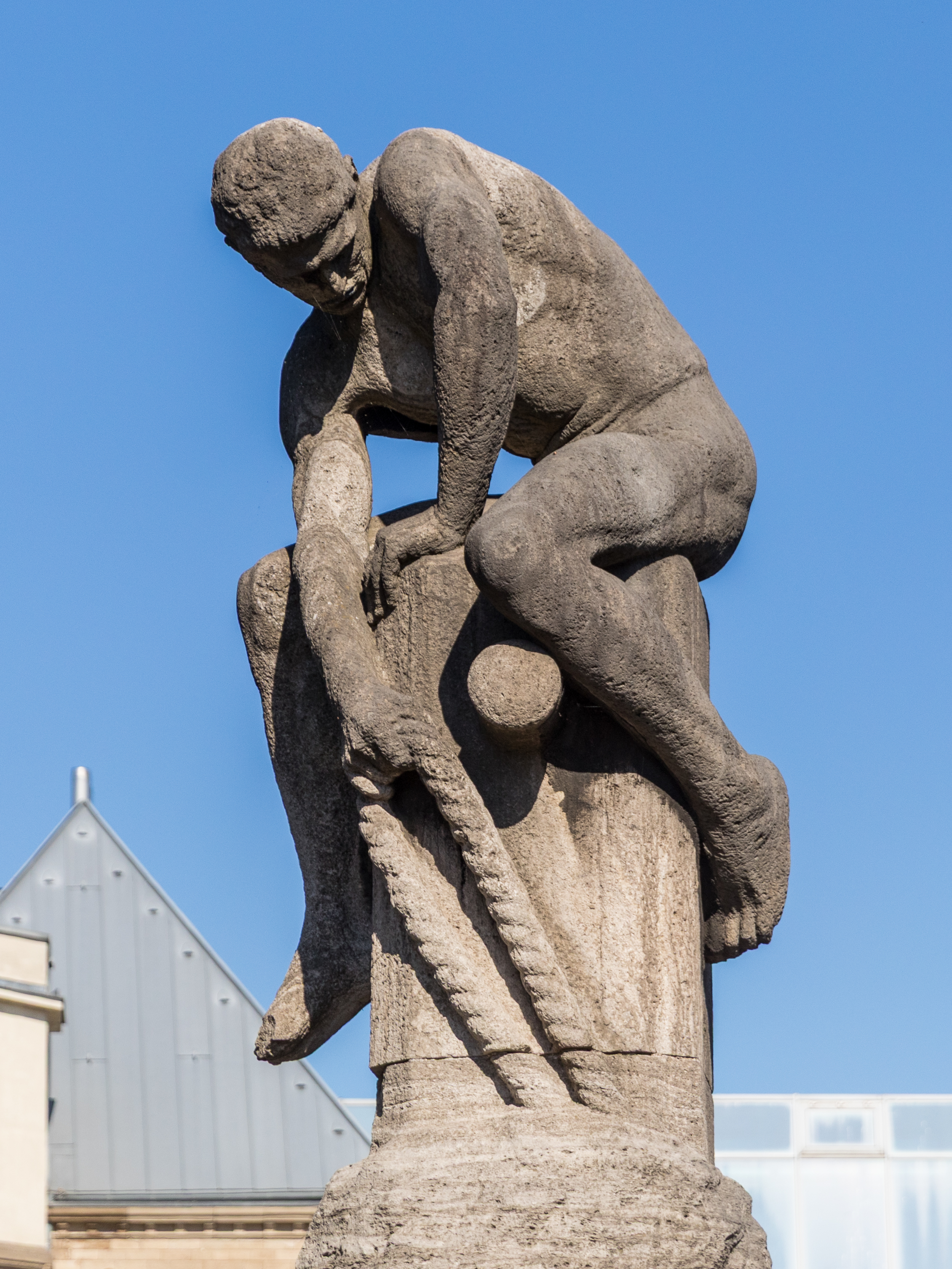
Detail of the statue from a different angle

The work is approximately 6.5 metres (21 ft) tall, of which the base makes up a little more than half. A reporter wrote in the Kölnisches Tageblatt:

"The Herculean naked man has climbed upon the bollard, which emerges at its base from unformed rock, and, leaning forwards, is hauling the rope up in order to secure it to it. His legs are clamped around the wood [of the bollard], and while his right [hand] is busy pulling the big hawser up with all his strength, the left firmly grasps the bollard."

In the pose and the modelling of the naked and muscular upper body, the statue is reminiscent of the Belvedere Torso.

Together with the nearby swing bridge and the railing on the pier, the Tauzieher was listed as a historical monument (number 66) on 1 July 1980 shortly after the North Rhine-Westphalia state law for the protection of monuments went into effect that day.

Tauzieher has been the subject of one of Tatzu Nishi's transformations, Obdach (1997).
