= Sprengel =

Sprengel is a surname. Notable people with the surname include:

- Hermann Sprengel (1834–1906), chemist
- Karl or Carl Sprengel (1787–1859), botanist
- Kurt Sprengel (1766–1833), botanist
- Christian Konrad Sprengel (1750–1816), teacher and theologist who studied flower biology
- Bernhard Sprengel (1899–1985), chocolate manufacturer and art collector

== See also ==
- Sprengel Museum, a museum of modern art in Hanover, Germany
- Sprengel pump, a vacuum pump invented by Hermann Sprengel
