= Nikolaus Friedrich =

German sculptor (1865–1914)

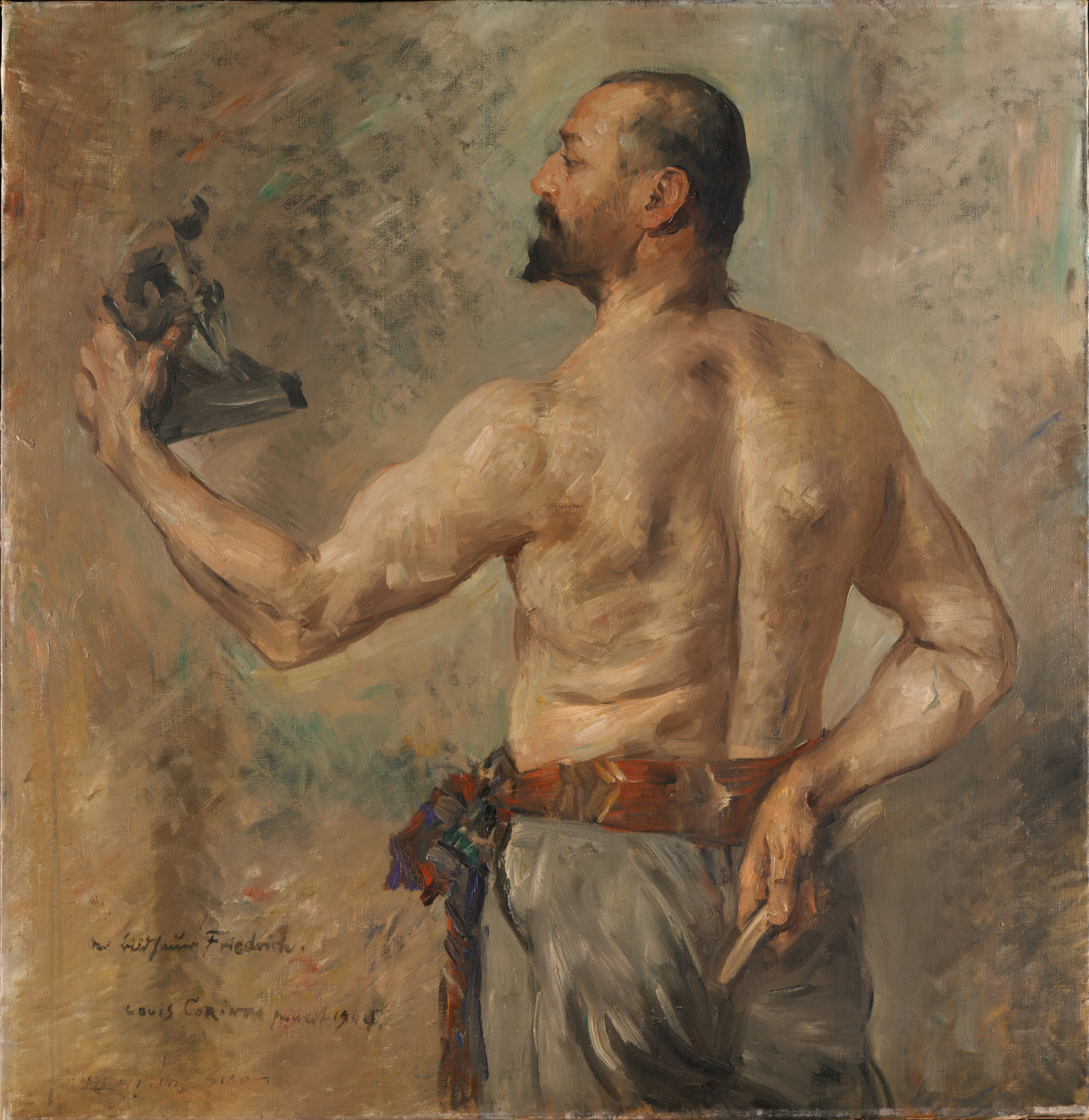
Nikolaus Friedrich; portrait by Lovis Corinth (1904)

Nikolaus Friedrich (17 July 1865, in Cologne – 6 February 1914, in Berlin) was a German sculptor.

== Life and work ==
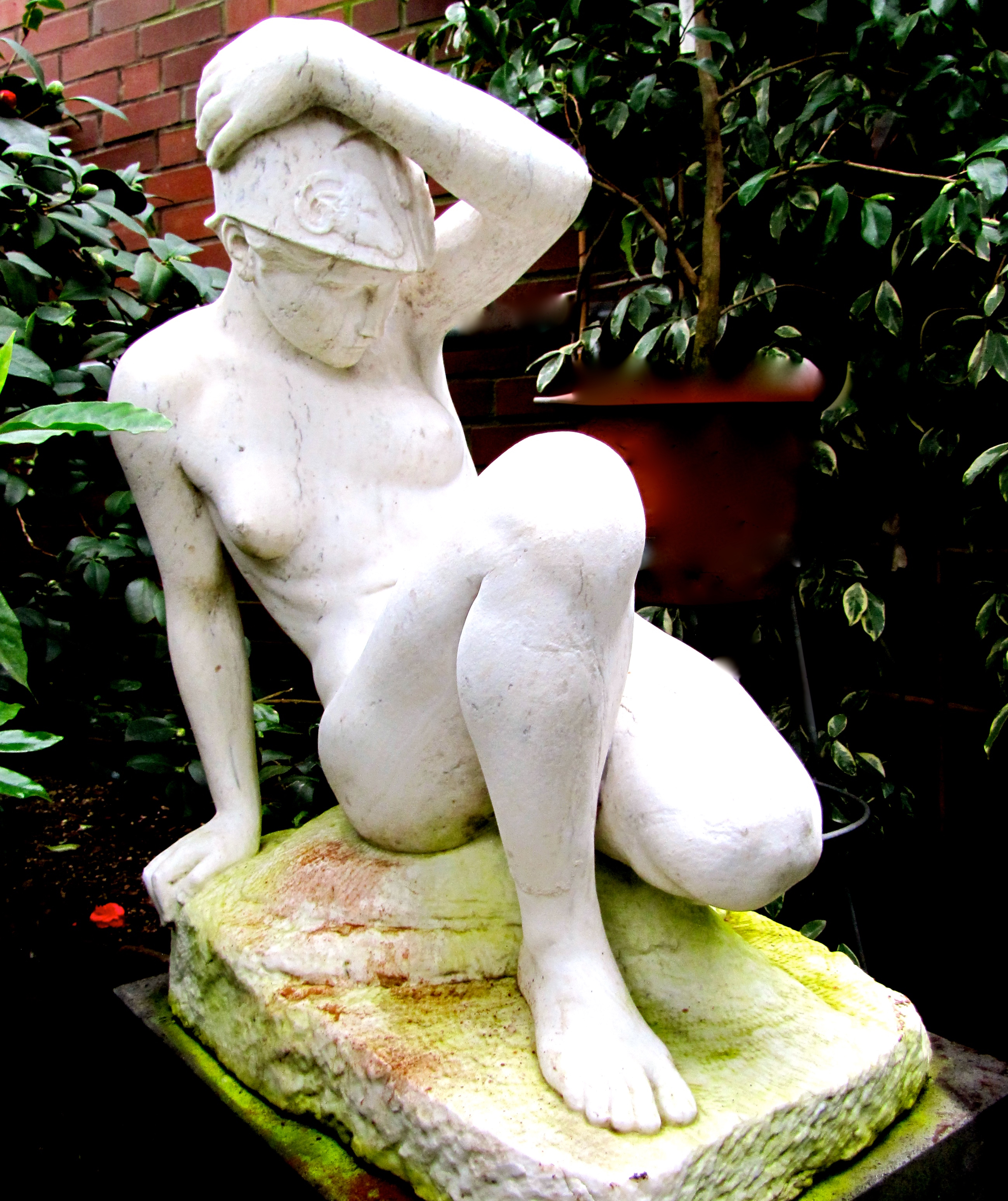
The Dying Amazon

He was born to Hubert Friedrich, a cabinetmaker, and his wife Gertrud née Weiler. After completing his primary education, he studied drawing with Wilhelm Albermann at the arts and crafts school. From 1891 to 1893 he helped create decorations for the World’s Columbian Exposition in Chicago. Upon returning to Germany, he continued his studies at what is now the Berlin University of the Arts.

In 1896, the Prussian Academy of Arts awarded him their "Rom-Preis" (modelled after the French Prix de Rome), which enabled him to stay at the Villa Strohl-Fern; an artists' retreat. From there, he made further study trips; to France and England. From 1897 to 1901, he was a master student and assistant of Reinhold Begas, who initially had a great influence on his style.

Later, during his studies, he became one of the followers of the stylistic movement begun by Adolf von Hildebrand, away from the Neo-Baroque, and received an award at the Exposition Universelle (1900). He also joined the Berlin Secession, and participated in their exhibitions until 1911. The Alte Nationalgalerie acquired two of his works. One, the "Bogenspanner" (Archer), was placed in front of the museum. Some of his sculptures were also acquired by the Wallraf-Richartz Museum and the Museum Folkwang.

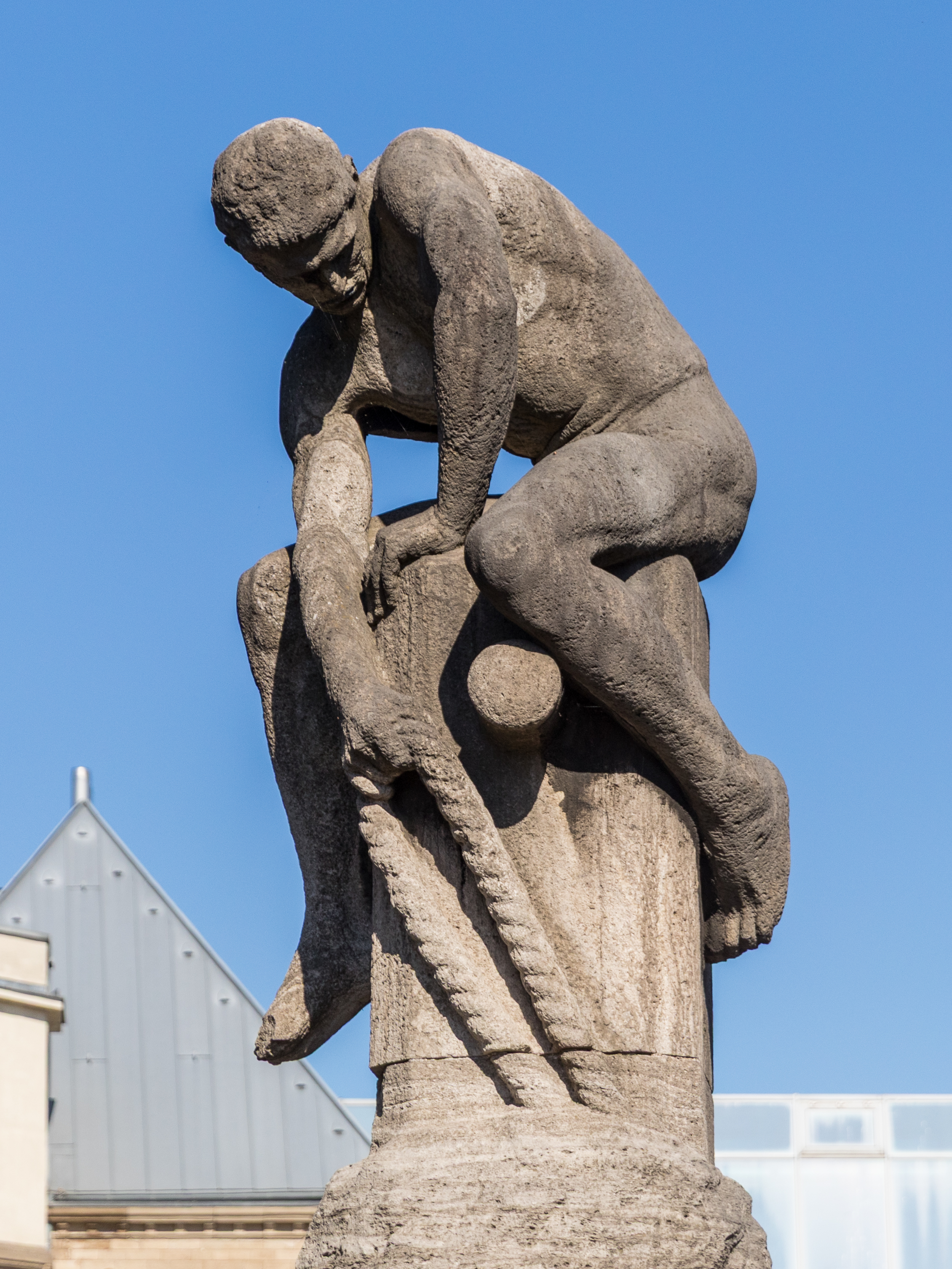
Der Tauzieher

His small statue, "Der Tauzieher" (a rope puller, mooring a ship), presented in 1908 at an exhibition of the Vereinigung Kölner Künstler (artists' association), at the Flora Botanical Garden, proved to be very popular. In 1911, a copy of the work, over twice the size of the original, was placed at Rheinauhafen harbor.

Most of his works portray nude figures. Two portraits of him, one without a shirt, were created by his friend, the artist Lovis Corinth. He died in 1914, aged 48, and was interred at the Friedhöfe vor dem Halleschen Tor. His grave has not been preserved.
