= Theodor Hildebrand & Sohn =

German chocolate factory (founded 1817)

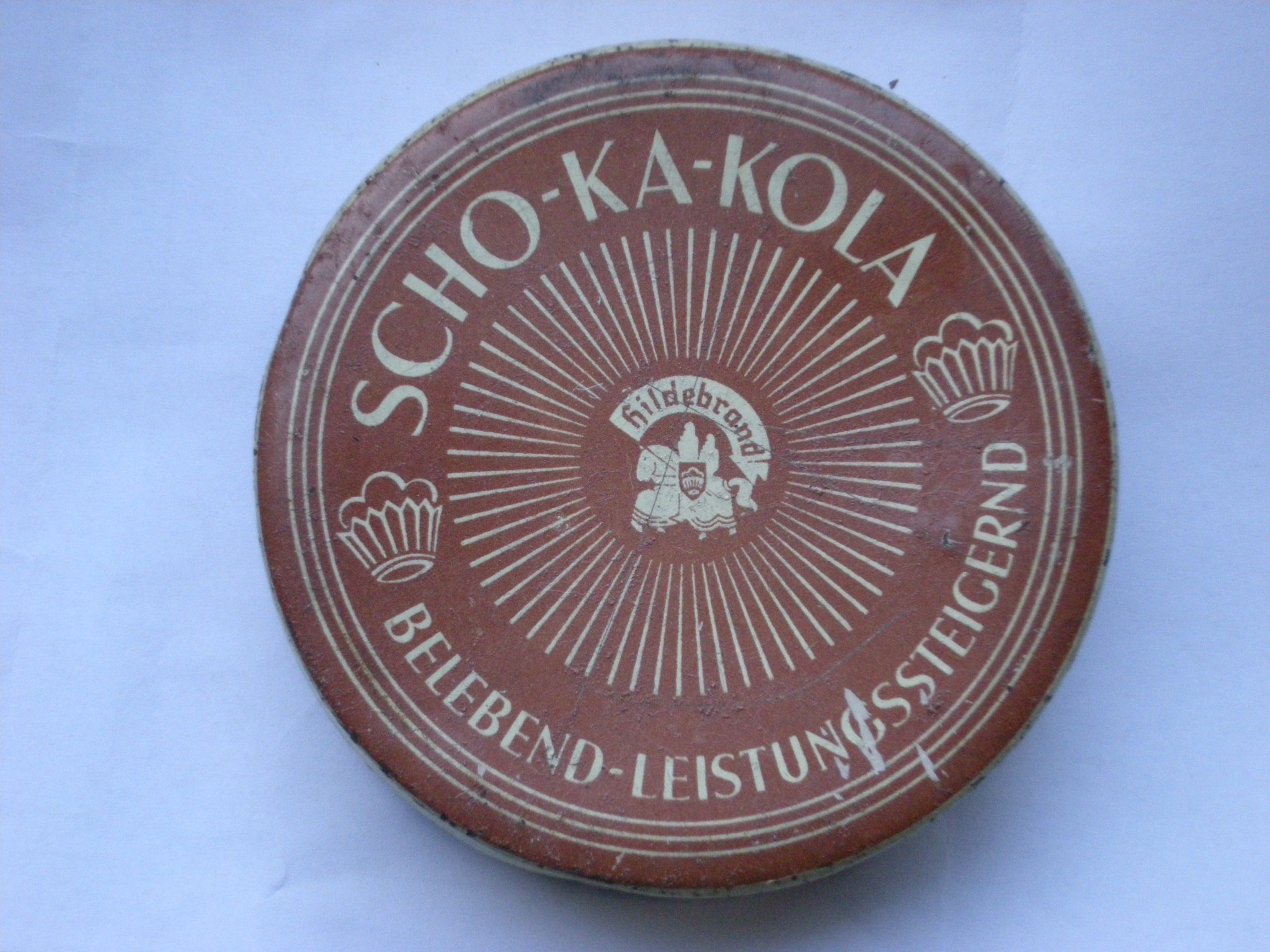
Scho-Ka-Kola (front) from Hildebrand

Theodor Hildebrand & Sohn, since 1930 Hildebrand, Kakao- und Schokoladenfabrik GmbH (Hildebrand, Cocoa and Chocolate Factory GmbH) was a German chocolate factory. The company was founded in 1817 by the confectioner Theodor Hildebrand and merged into Stollwerck in 1996.

== History ==
In 1812, confectioner Theodor Hildebrand founded a small shop and, in 1817, the company Theodor Hildebrand & Sohn on Spandauer Strasse in the centre of Berlin. Theodor Hildebrand was, among other things, a Prussian purveyor to the court.

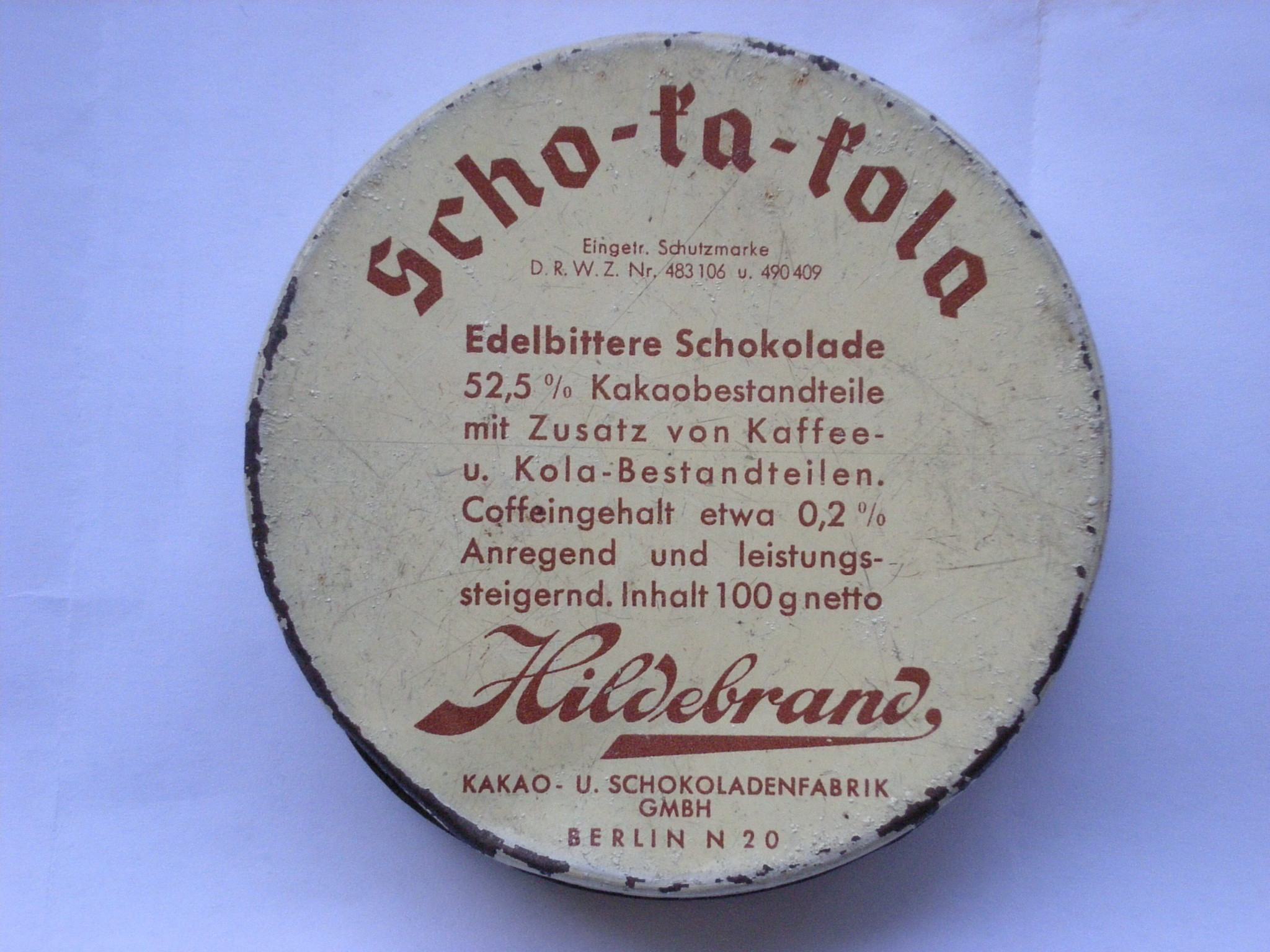
Scho-Ka-Kola (back) from Hildebrand

Since 1830, Hildebrand was using steam engines to make chocolate. This meant that he was able to offer chocolate, known as 'steam chocolate', in previously unheard quantities at a low price. His sons and grandsons expanded production so that in 1888 an additional factory was built on Pankstrasse directly on Brunnenplatz. Theodor Hildebrand & Sohn became a major employer in the Berlin-Wedding industrial district. The company became known for its collector's albums, which could be filled with stickers from the chocolate wrappers. A particularly popular album was released in 1900, depicting what life could be like in the year 2000.

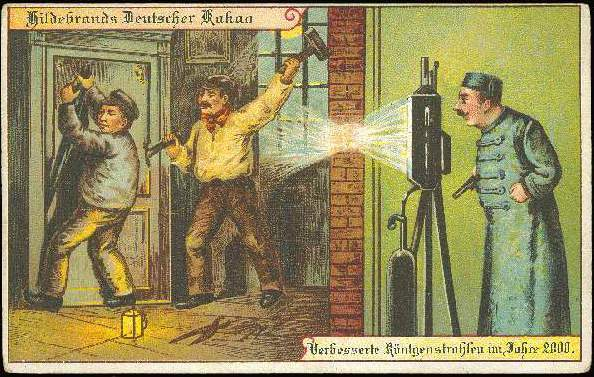
Hildebrand's collection card from 1900 about life in the year 2000

In 1935 the company introduced Scho-Ka-Kola. The caffeine-enriched chocolate was intended to be marketed as a high-energy sports chocolate during the Summer Olympics in Berlin in 1936. It was later nicknamed pilot’s chocolate since it was often consumed by the German Air Force pilots. The company also released chocolates into the market which contained 14 milligrams of methamphetamine. It was recommended to eat three to nine pieces, which would help make housework easier and assist with weight lose since the drug was an appetite suppressant. Compared to caffeine it was supposedly harmless.

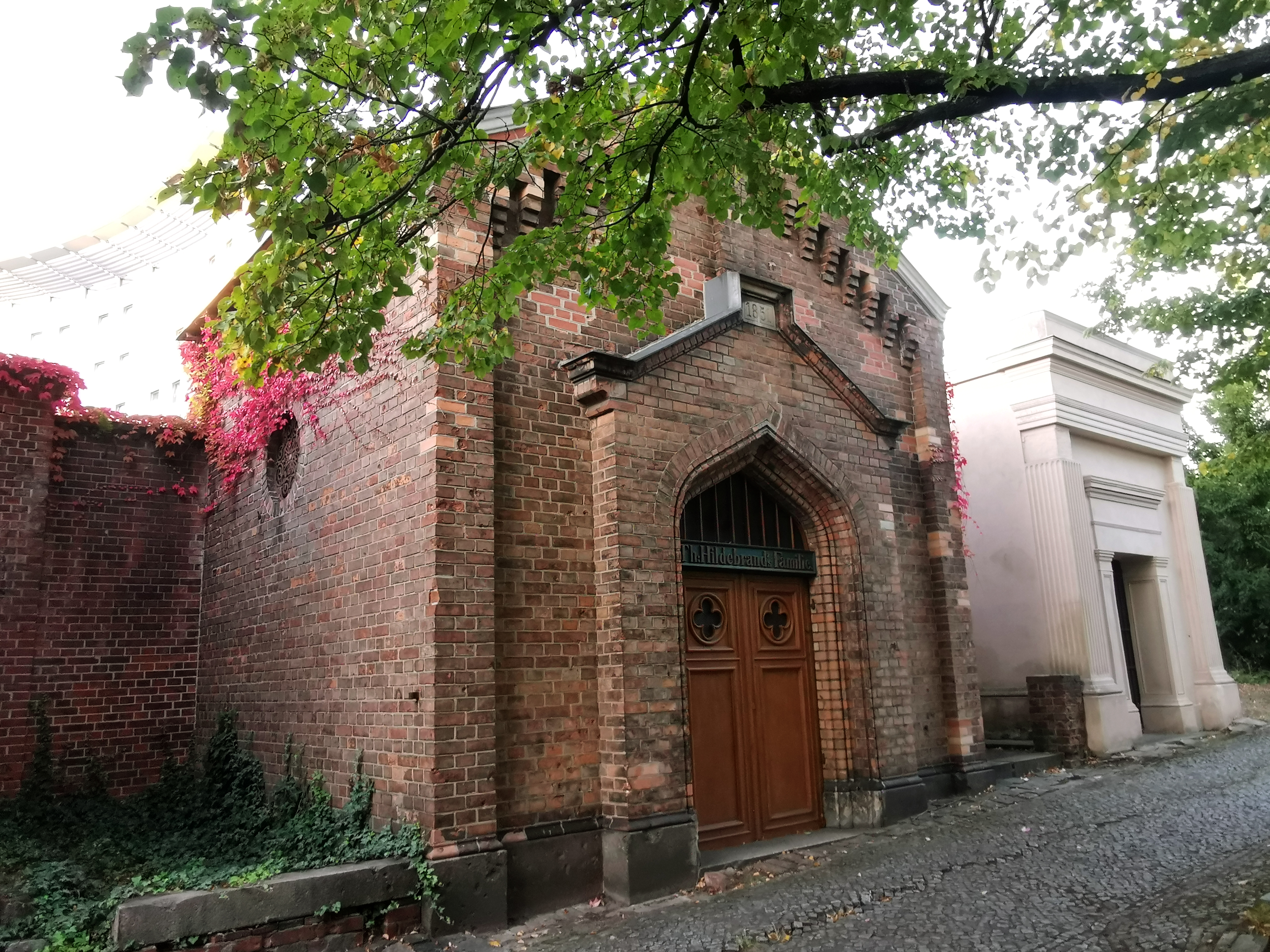
Hildebrand family mausoleum in Berlin-Prenzlauer Berg

During the Second World War a large part of the production facilities were destroyed. However by 1951, the company was able to restore machines and return to pre-war production levels.

After Germany lifted price controls for chocolate bars in 1964, Hildebrand, like many German chocolate manufacturers, ran into economic difficulties and went bankrupt in 1968. Hans Imhoff took over the company in 1969. In 1972, Imhoff also bought Stollwerck and merged the two companies in 1996. The chocolate factory in Berlin-Marienfelde still produces products under the Stollwerck brand name.

== Honours ==
In honour of Theodor Hildebrand, the Hildebrandstraße in the Berlin district of Tiergarten was named after him.
