= Stollwerck =

German chocolate manufacturer

Stollwerck GmbH
- Industry: food and tobacco industry manufacture of cocoa, chocolate and sugar confectionery
- Predecessor: Goldina
- Founded: 1839; 187 years ago in Cologne, Germany
- Founder: Franz Stollwerck
- Parent: Barry Callebaut AG (from 2002); Baronie Group (since 2011)
- Website: stollwerck.de

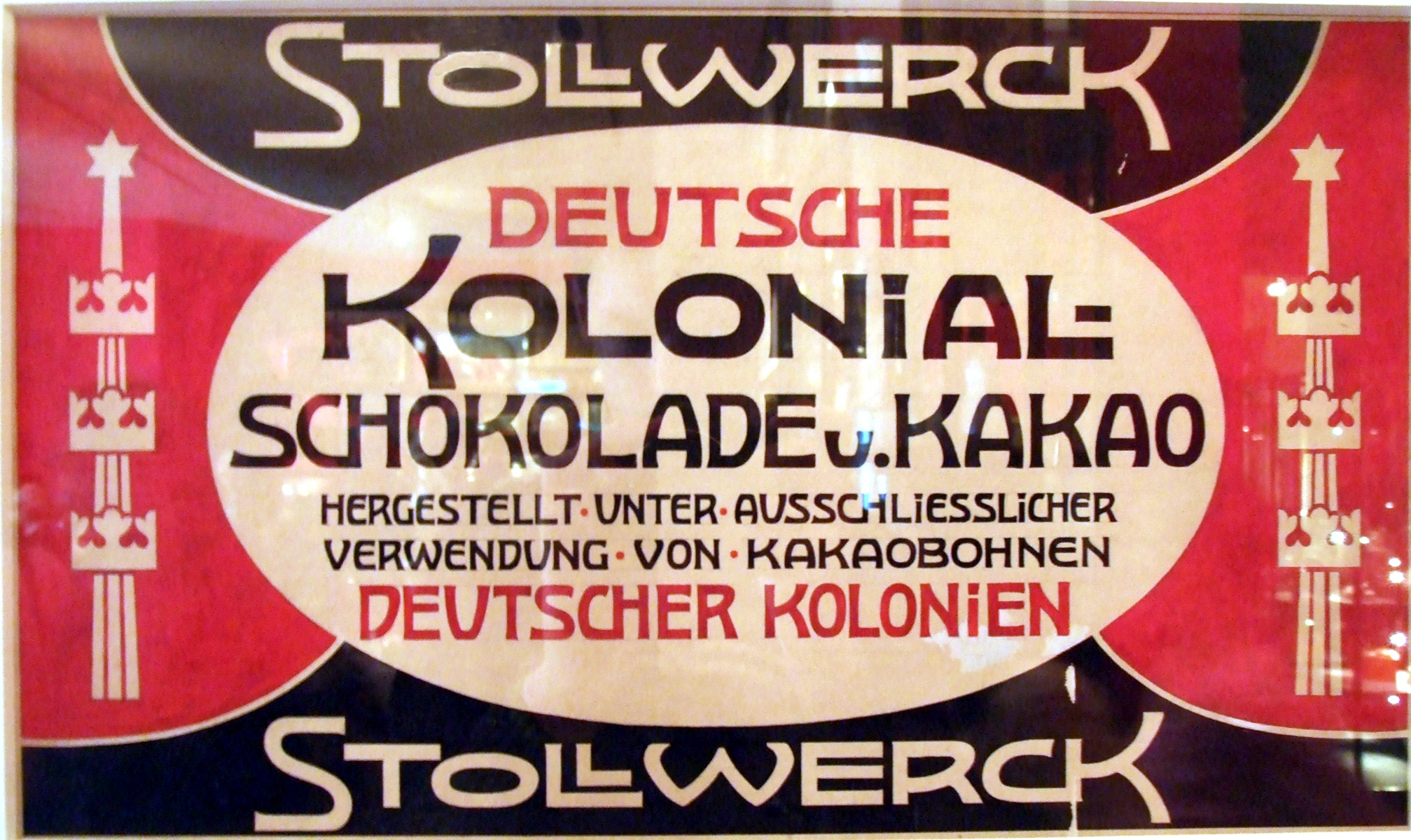
A Stollwerck chocolate bar from 1890

Stollwerck GmbH is a German chocolate manufacturer based in Norderstedt, Schleswig-Holstein. It was founded in 1839 and expanded internationally in Europe and America, becoming the second largest producer of chocolate in the United States by 1900. Stollwerck was owned by Barry Callebaut from 2002 to 2011. Since October 2011 it has belonged to Belgian firm Baronie Group.

== History ==
=== From beginnings until the Second World War ===
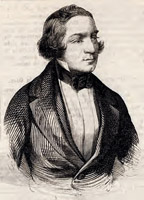
Franz Stollwerck

In 1839 the baker Franz Stollwerck started business in Cologne, Germany. He diversified into chocolate and other candy, having particular success with cough drops. In 1860 production was expanded to include chocolate, marzipan and printen. Local pharmacists requested that he be prevented from selling such medicinal items in 1845, but this was rejected. His business flourished in Germany and also he opened two coffee houses in Cologne. One of these was briefly converted into a music hall before becoming a chocolate and candy factory in the 1860s. In 1871 his sons registered a separate company Gebrüder Stollwerck (Stollwerck Brothers) which merged back into the original company in 1876, after the death of Franz Stollwerck.

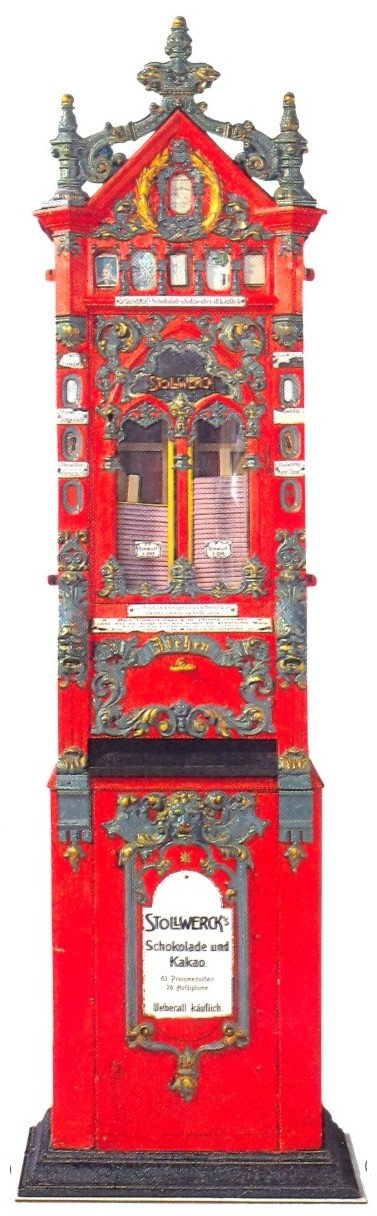
Stollwerck vending machine, 1887

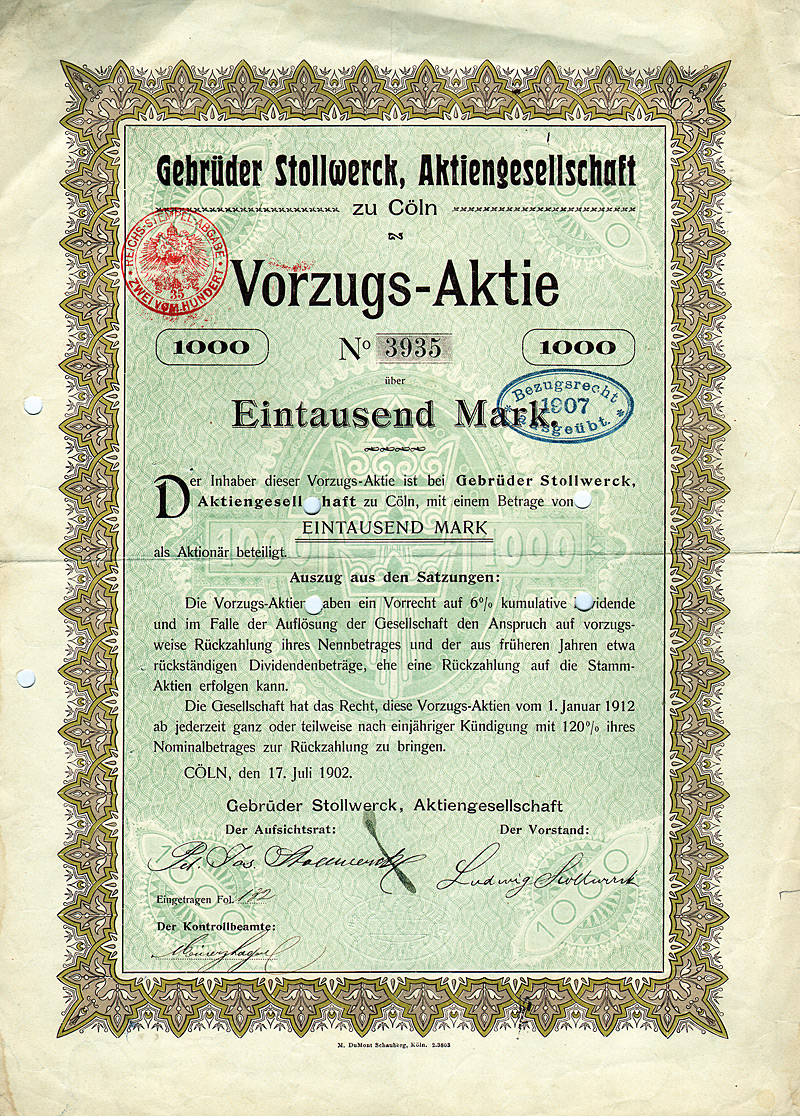
Preferred share of the Gebrüder Stollwerck AG, issued 17. July 1902

Stollwerck's five sons expanded the business into a multinational corporation with plants in Europe and America. The second youngest of the brothers, Ludwig Stollwerck was instrumental in introducing new technology including the first vending machines in 1887. These were initially used to sell small samples of chocolate, but their immediate popularity meant they were soon used to sell entire bars. In 1893 Stollwerck was selling its chocolate in 15,000 vending machines. It set up separate companies in various territories to manufacture vending machines to sell not just chocolate, but cigarettes, matches, chewing gum and soap products. For the Budapest subway, which opened in 1896, a Vienna-based Austrian-Hungarian Stollwerck subsidiary manufactured not only candy machines for the stations, but also a ticket machine. By 1890 its Cologne works alone had 1500 staff.

Stollwerck turned their focus to exporting their products. Subsidiaries were formed in England, Belgium and Austria-Hungary. At the 1893 World's Columbian Exposition in Chicago, IL they exhibited a pavilion made out of thirty-thousand pounds of chocolate and cocoa butter that enshrined a statue of Germania, ten feet tall in solid chocolate. [Image from Bancroft, Hubert Howe The Book of the Fair. The Bancroft Company, 1893.]

In 1894 Stollwerck founded Volkmann, Stollwerck & Company in the USA, in partnership with German businessman John Volkmann to produce vending machines in their factory in New York. By the late 1890s there were over 4,000 of its vending machines on New York train stations. It also became a leading manufacturer of cinematographs. In 1902 the company went public, for which purpose the Stollwerck brothers later also joined the Kolonial-Wirtschaftliches Komitee (Colonial Economic Committee), which had been represented in Cologne since 1905.

At the turn of the century, branches had been established in Berlin, Breslau, Bremen, Frankfurt, Leipzig, Munich, Amsterdam, Brussels, Budapest, Chicago and Vienna, as well as factories in Berlin, Bratislava, London and New York. Stollwerck also took over other brands such as Dr. Michaelis' Acorn Cacao and used its position as purveyor to the court as well as the international awards ("27 court diplomas, 70 gold medals") it had received as advertisement. It wasn't until the First World War, which began in 1914, that Stollwercks rapid growth ended.

In 1927 Karl Stollwerck built the Stollwerck Mausoleum near Feldkirchen, Upper Bavaria, a rare combination of a family tomb also used for protestant service.

In 1928, the Hamburg factory was taken over by the Kakao Compagnie Theodor Reichhardt (Theodor Reichhardt cocoa company) for 10 million Reichsmarks and its operations were relocated to Cologne. In the years that followed, the company was awarded as a Nationalsozialistischer Musterbetrieb (National Socialist model company).

Costly acquisitions and the global economic downturn of the Great Depression devastated Stollwerck's finances. It had to be rescued by Deutsche Bank in the 1930s and under the leadership of bank directors Georg Solmssen and Karl Kimmich the company was restructured, which marked the end of its family ownership. The renovators measures were not very successful and in 1970, Stollwerck was named "Versager des Jahres" (Failure of the Year) by the business magazine Capital.

During the Second World War, food rationing and the scarcity of cocoa drastically reduced the firm's market.

=== From the Post Second World War period to the present ===
After the Second World War the firm was left with damaged factories and much of its manufacturing equipment expropriated as reparations. It restarted production in 1949 and fared moderately in the face of intense competition in the 1950s and 1960s. Its finances worsened until 1972, when Hans Imhoff bought the company and guided it to great success as a chocolate manufacturer with plants in West Germany and abroad, directly competing with long-established brands such as Sarotti. Over the next 30 years, Stollwerck became one of the largest chocolate manufacturers with factories in Germany and abroad as well as taking over traditional brands such as Sprengel, Sarotti and Chocolaterie Jacques in Eupen. In 1969 Imhoff took over the Hildebrand chocolate factory, with the Waldbaur factory following in 1976, which both were later incorporated into Stollwerck. The concentration of production led to the traditional Cologne factory in the Severinsviertel being abandoned in the mid-1970s. This was helped by a 10 million DM subsidy from the city of Cologne and a 25 million DM purchase price for the site, which was occupied by demonstrators for 47 days in 1980.

After the reunification of Germany, Stollwerck quickly invested in the former East Germany, buying the Thuringian Chocolate Factory GmbH in Saalfeld, makers of Rotstern brand chocolate and the German Democratic Republic's largest chocolate producer.

In 1993 the Imhoff-Stollwerck chocolate museum was built for 53 million DM and opened in Rheinauhafen, Cologne to exhibit items from Stollwerck's history and the history and science of chocolate making.

Stollwerck opened a chocolate factory in Székesfehérvár, Hungary in 1995 and became the market leader. It achieved similar success in Poland and Russia.

In 2001 Hans Imhoff retired and Stollwerck sold its Eastern European subsidiaries to Kraft Foods.

In 2002 Stollwerck was sold to Barry Callebaut AG, the world's largest chocolate company, which is majority owned by the Jacobs family. Barry Callebaut then bought back its public shares and ceased production at the parent factory in Cologne, just leaving administrative functions there.

In 2006, Barry Callebaut's management ended its collaboration with the Imhoff-Stollwerck chocolate museum and Lindt & Sprüngli became the museum's new partner. The museum's name was changed to Imhoff chocolate museum and many Stollwerck exhibits were removed.

In October 2011 Barry Callebaut sold Stollwerck to the Baronie Group of Veurne, Belgium. At that time, Stollwerck had five factories in Belgium, Germany and Switzerland; it employed 1700 staff and its annual production was around 100,000 tonnes of chocolate. In 2016, after 177 years, the remaining parts of the company were moved from Cologne to Norderstedt.

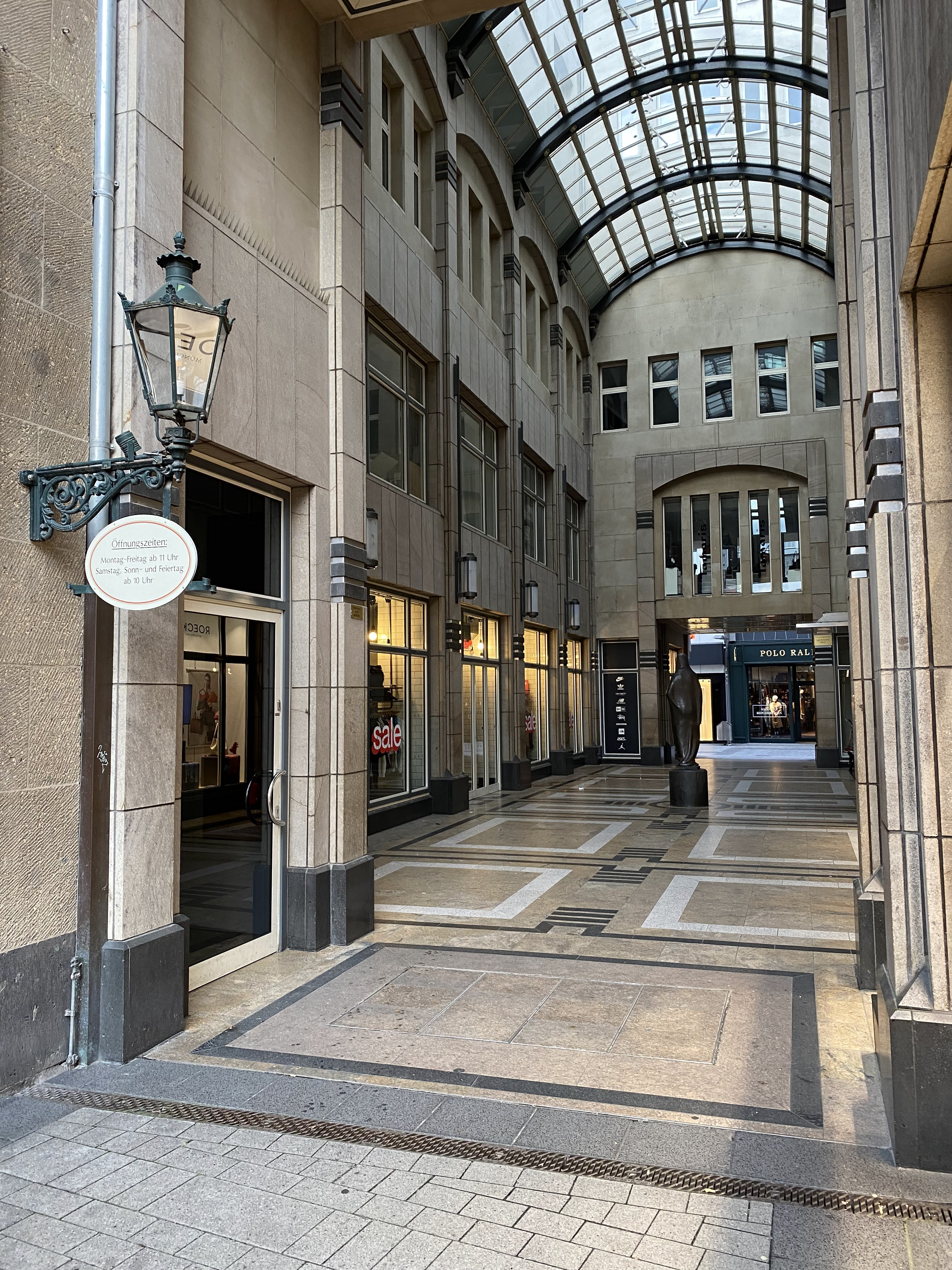
The Stollwerck Passage in Cologne, Germany

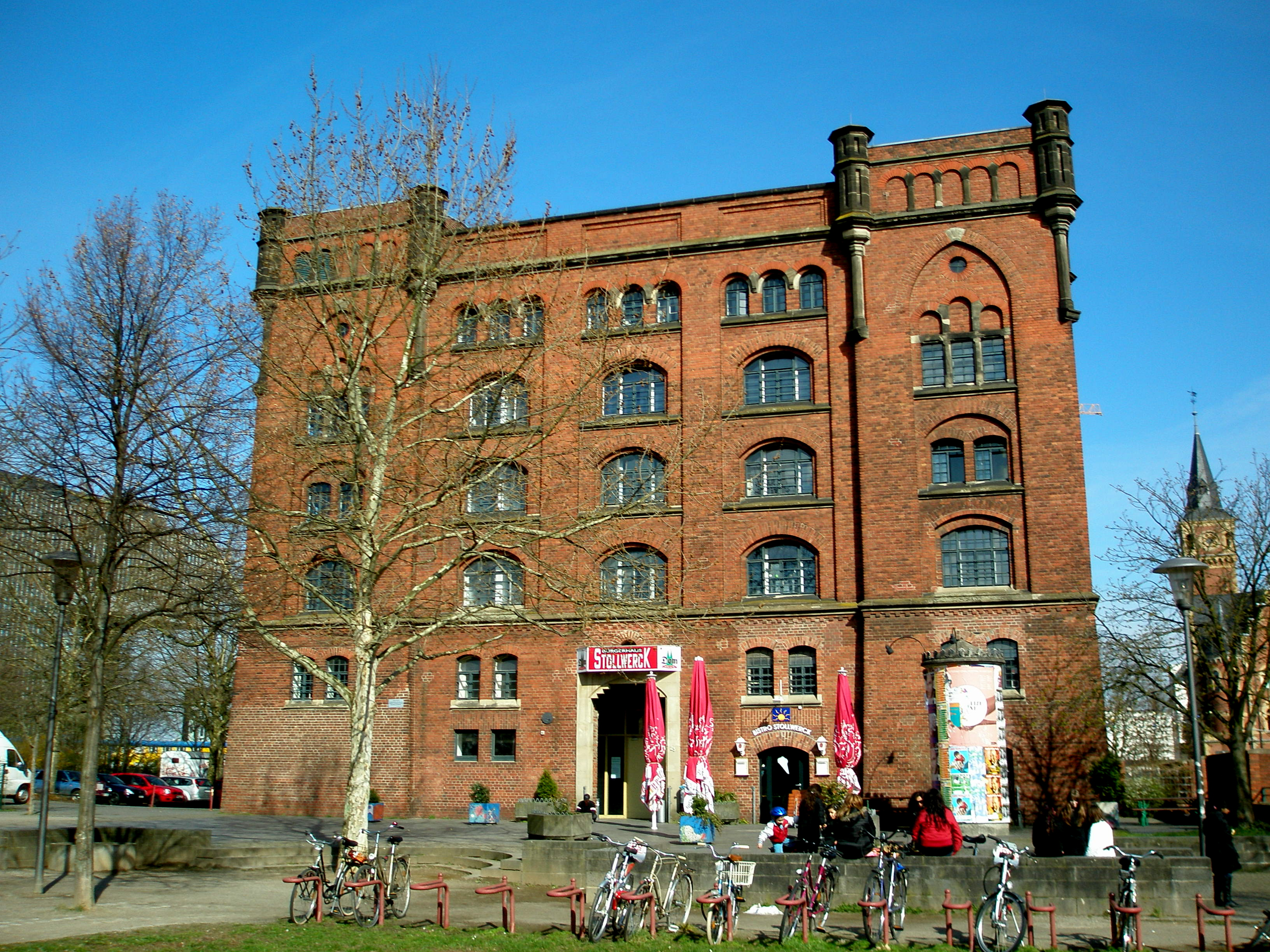
Civic center Stollwerck, Cologne

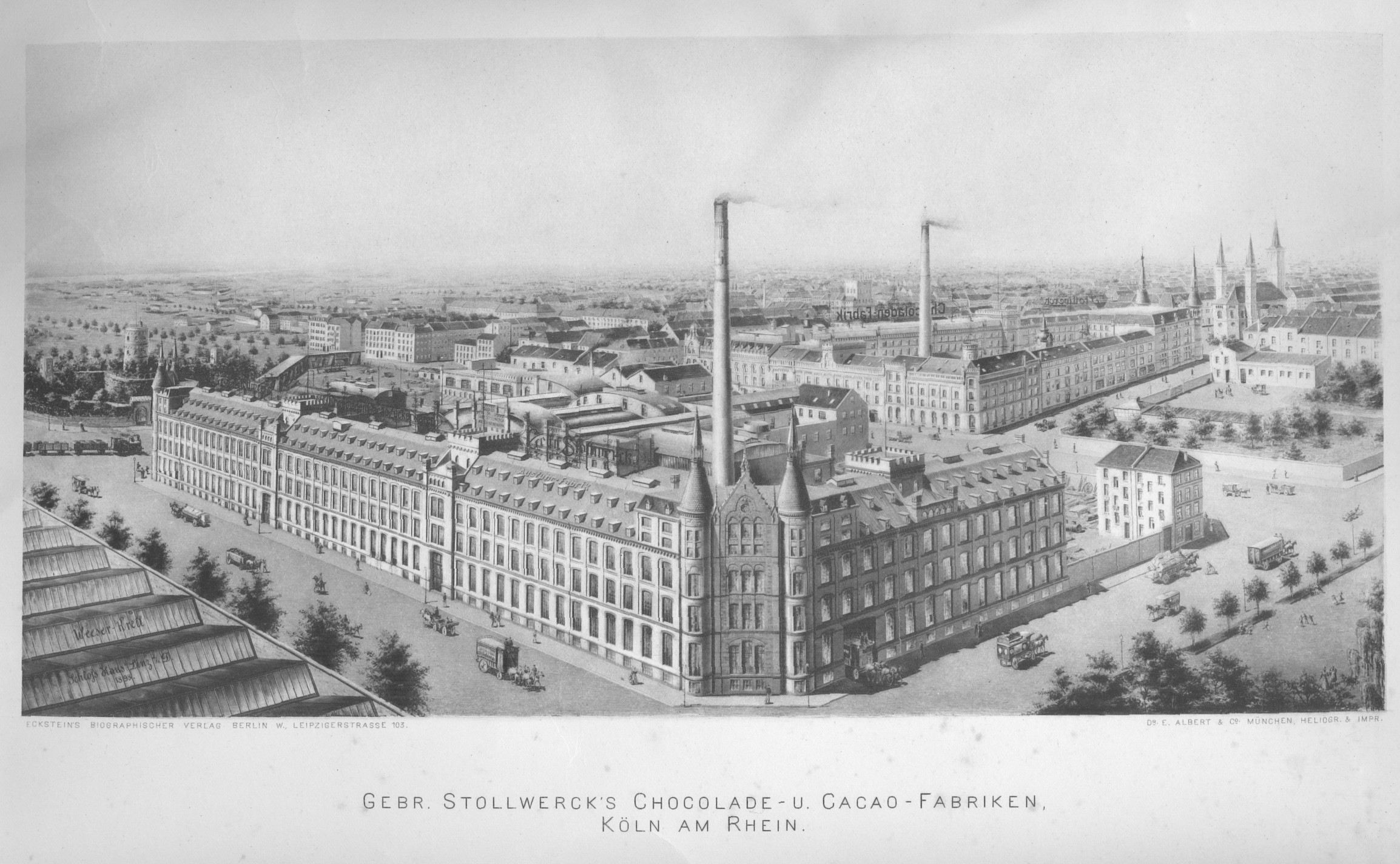
Köln am Rhein factory, 1898

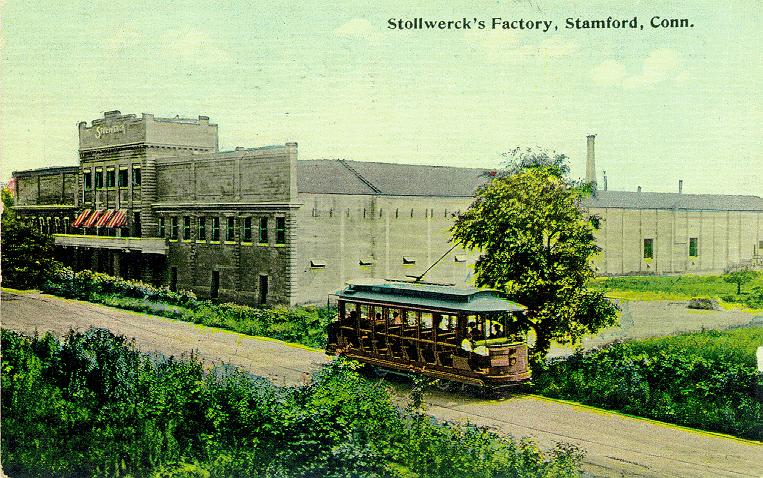
Stamford, Connecticut factory, 1907

== See also ==
- Imhoff-Schokoladenmuseum – the Cologne Chocolate Museum
- List of bean-to-bar chocolate manufacturers
