= Schokoladenmuseum Köln =

Confectionary museum in Cologne, Germany

Coordinates: 50°55′55.93″N 6°57′51.38″E

Chocolate Museum Cologne
- Schokoladenmuseum Köln
- Established: 1993; 33 years ago
- Location: Cologne, Germany
- Visitors: 650,000 (2023)
- Public transit access: 1 5 7 9 at Heumarkt; 3 4 17 at Severinstraße
- Website: http://www.schokoladenmuseum.de

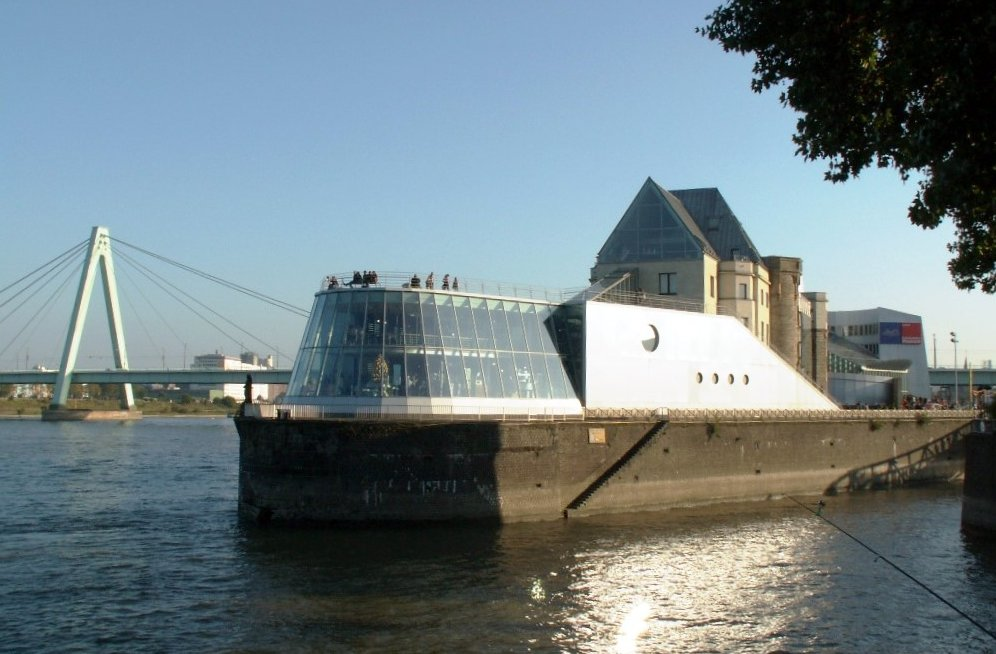
Imhoff-Schokoladenmuseum

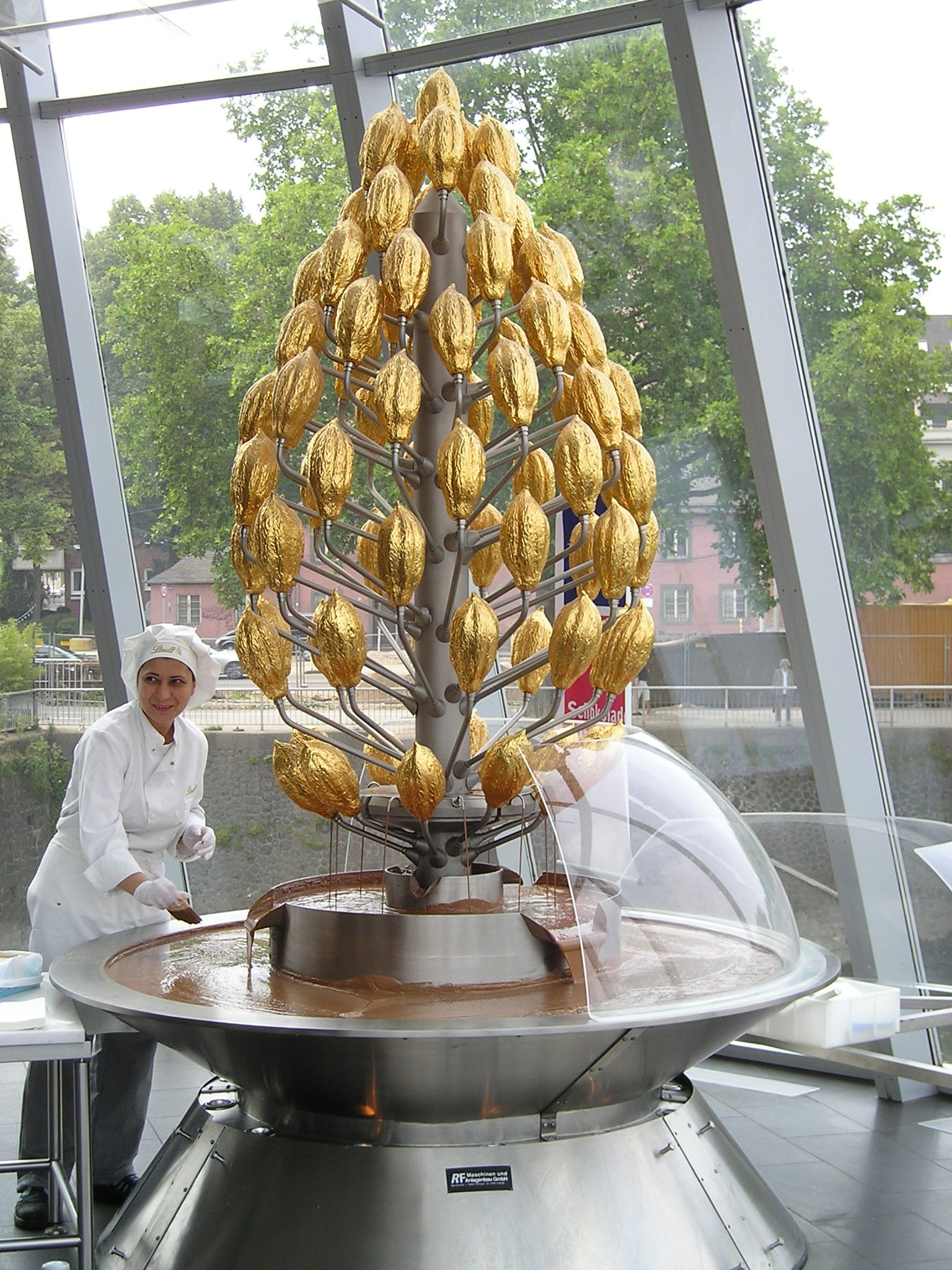
Chocolate fountain

The Schokoladenmuseum Köln (Imhoff Chocolate Museum) was opened by Hans Imhoff on 31 October 1993. It is situated in the Cologne quarter of Altstadt-Süd on the Rheinauhafen peninsula. The exhibits show the entire history of chocolate, from its beginnings with the Olmecs, Maya, and Aztecs to contemporary products and production methods. The exhibition building houses a permanent exhibition on modern chocolate production.

With 4,000 guided tours and 650,000 visitors a year, the museum is in the top ten museums in Germany. The museum is entirely self-supporting, receiving no subsidy. It has its own marketing department and is used by the Schokoladenmuseum Gastronomie GmbH for events.

== History ==
The founder of the museum was the Cologne chocolate manufacturer Hans Imhoff. Stollwerck AG, a majority of which he has owned since January 1972, was one of the leading, historically important chocolate manufacturers worldwide. It had an extensive pool of exhibits, which the company owner noticed when moving to the new location in Cologne-Westhoven in December 1975. He came up with the idea of building a chocolate museum where these exhibits would be better kept. When the Stollwerck company moved to Cologne-Westhoven, he also made sure that a comprehensive stock of business documents and photos documenting the history of the company and the Stollwerck entrepreneurial family, as well as numerous exhibits, were preserved.

His idea of the museum initially met with skepticism. However, he embarked on an experiment in which he organized an exhibition in Cologne's Gürzenich from July 8 to August 20, 1989 to mark the 150th anniversary of the Stollwerck company and presented a chocolate fountain. Within six weeks, more than five times as many visitors as he had stipulated came to the exhibition. The museum was built independently of the production facilities as the first building in the new Rheinauhafen district by the architect Fritz Eller.

Hans Imhoff planned to set up this chocolate museum starting in October 1991. According to the purchase agreement dated 23 January 1992, Imhoff acquired Hall 10, the Prussian Customs Office (1898), the Malakoff Tower and the swing bridge from the owner of the area, Häfen und Güterverkehr Köln. It also consists of a new building completed by October 1993, the shape of which symbolizes post-modern ship motifs. The opening of the Chocolate Museum took place on 31 October 1993. The construction costs of the museum, which is still the only one of its kind today, amounted to 53 million DEM.

Hans Imhoff sold Stollwerck to Barry Callebaut AG in 2002. In 2006, Barry Callebaut's management ended its collaboration with the Chocolate Museum and Lindt & Sprüngli became the museum's new partner. The name of the museum was then changed from Imhoff Stollwerck Chocolate Museum to Imhoff Chocolate Museum. Since at least 2017 it has been called the Cologne Chocolate Museum.

== Operator ==
The museum is run by the Schokoladenmuseum Köln GmbH. Since March 2006, the Swiss chocolate manufacturer Lindt & Sprüngli has been its partner in producing exhibits. Prior to that the partner was the Cologne chocolate producer Stollwerck, and the museum was formerly known as the Imhoff-Stollwerck-Museum.

== Attractions ==
The exhibition shows the entire history of chocolate, from its beginnings with the Olmec, Maya and Aztecs to today's chocolate-containing products and their production methods. A miniature production facility is installed on the 4,000 m^{2} (43,000 square feet) exhibition area, which demonstrates to the visitor how industrial chocolate production works.

- A small tropicarium, open to visitors, consists of a 10 m^{2} (110 sq ft) glass cube housing cacao trees of the species Theobroma cacao and Theobroma grandiflorum.
- Miniature versions of machines used in the production of chocolate, allowing visitors to observe the process of making the small chocolate bars which are given out at the entrance.
- A special attraction is the 3-metre (9.8 ft) tall chocolate fountain; an employee dips wafers into the liquid chocolate and distributes them to the visitors.
- At the entrance of the museum is a shop with a wide range of chocolate products and pralines. In 2006, the chocolate museum entered a partnership deal with Lindt & Sprüngli, therefore most of the products in the shop are by this manufacturer. This deal succeeded its previous one with the Cologne-based chocolate producer Stollwerck.

Among the most valuable items in the museum's collection are 18th and 19th-century porcelain and silver bowls and vessels for drinking chocolate from pre-Columbian Mesoamerica. The museum also has on display historical chocolate machines and moulds for forming chocolate in different shapes, and a collection of historical chocolate vending machines.

== Location and importance ==
The museum is located in the center of Cologne on the Rheinau peninsula in the Rheinauhafen. With 4,000 guided tours and 650,000 visitors a year, it is the most visited museum in Cologne and one of the ten most visited German museums. The operation of the museum does not require any subsidies, which is also supported by its own marketing department. It is used as an event location by the Schokoladenmuseum Gastronomie GmbH.
