= Sprengel Museum =

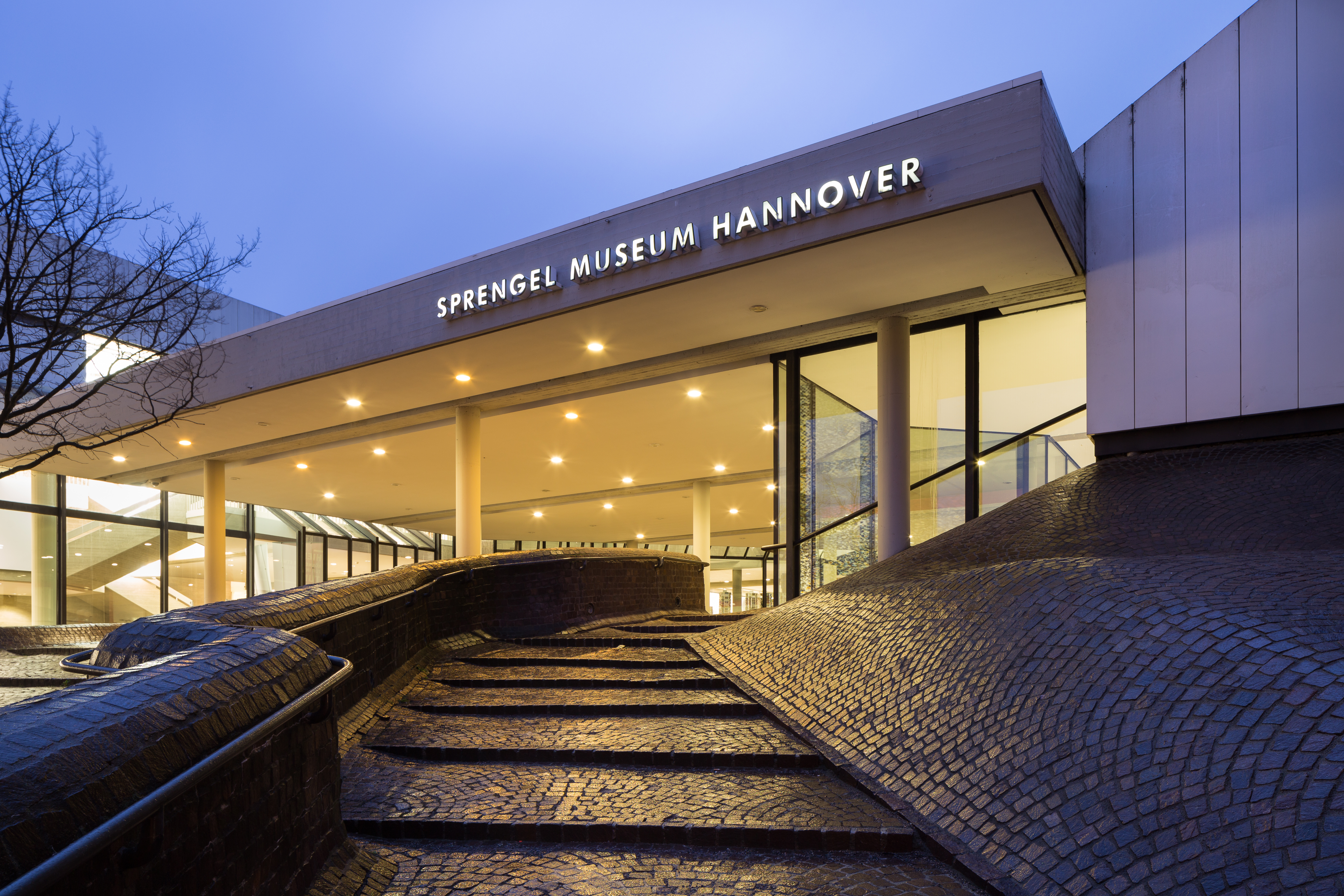
- Established: 1979; 47 years ago
- Location: Hanover, Lower Saxony, Germany
- Coordinates: 52°21′46″N 9°44′25″E
- Type: Art museum
- Website: www.sprengel-museum.de/en

Sprengel Museum is a museum of modern art in Hanover, Lower Saxony, holding one of the most significant collections of modern art in Germany. It is located in a building situated adjacent to the Masch Lake (German: Maschsee) approximately 150 metres (490 ft) south of the state museum. The museum opened in 1979, and the building, designed by Peter and Ursula Trint (of Cologne) and Dieter Quast (of Heidelberg), was extended in 1992.

Bernhard Sprengel donated his extensive collection of modern art to the city of Hanover in 1969, as well as financially supporting the construction of the museum. The city of Hanover and the state of Lower Saxony agreed to operate the museum jointly. In addition to the works donated by Sprengel, the museum also houses 20th century artworks owned by Lower Saxony and Hanover.

== Expansion ==
A further expansion, designed by Zürich-based architects Meili + Peter, was originally planned for 2010 but is now expected to begin around 2012. The cuboid design of the new building was chosen from 65 entrants in an international architecture competition. The original plan would have created an extra 4,350 square metres (46,800 sq ft) of exhibition space, and was expected to cost around €25 million, with €10M coming from Lower Saxony's EU funding, €5M directly from Lower Saxony, €5M from the city of Hanover, and €5M expected from donors. These estimates have since been reduced. A major objective of the expansion is to allow extensive coverage of Niki de Saint Phalle and the Hanoverian artist Kurt Schwitters. The new building will also be used for one-off international exhibitions.

== Works ==
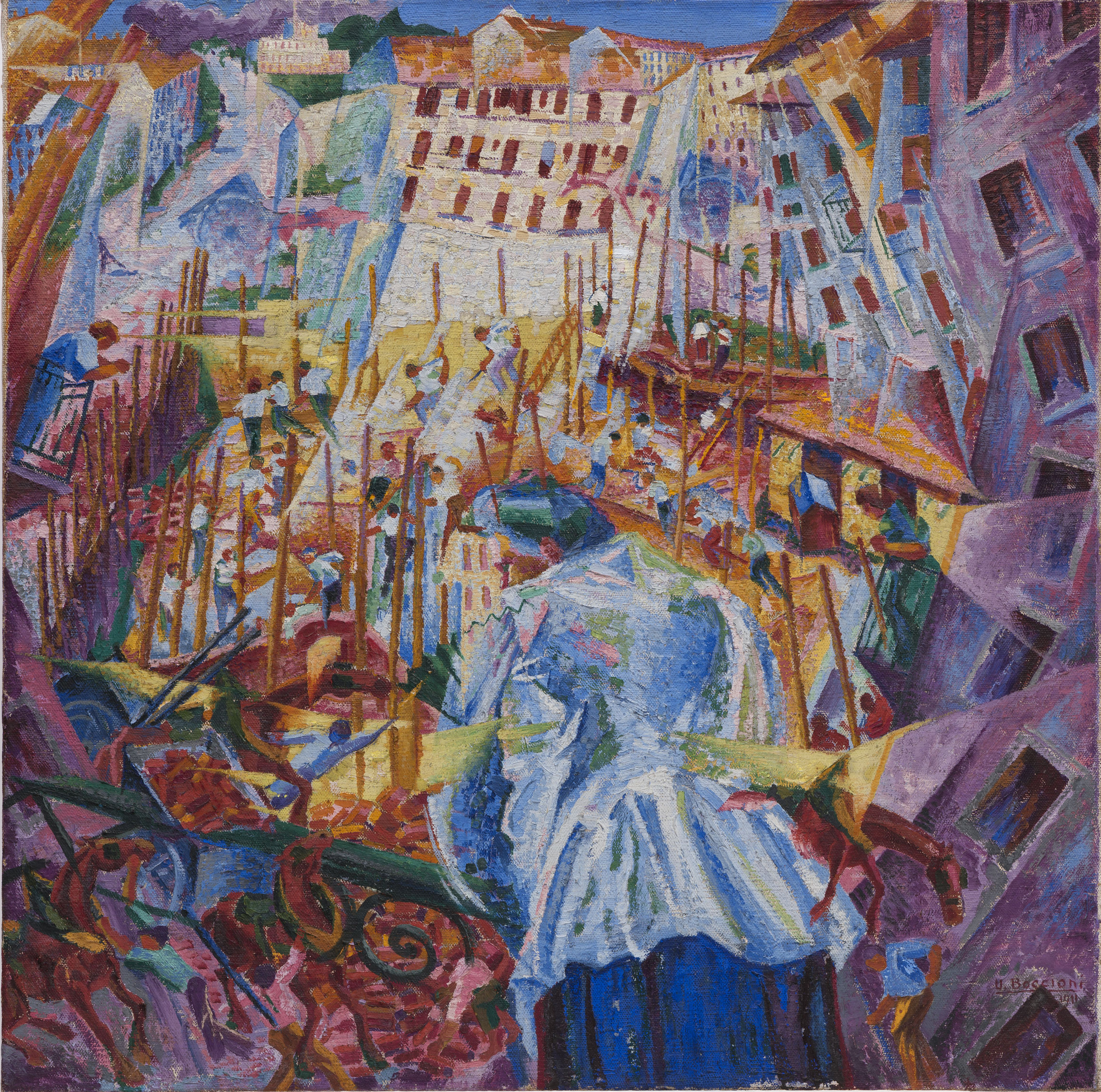
Umberto Boccioni, 1911, The Street Enters the House, oil on canvas, 100 cm × 100.6 cm (39.4 in × 39.6 in)

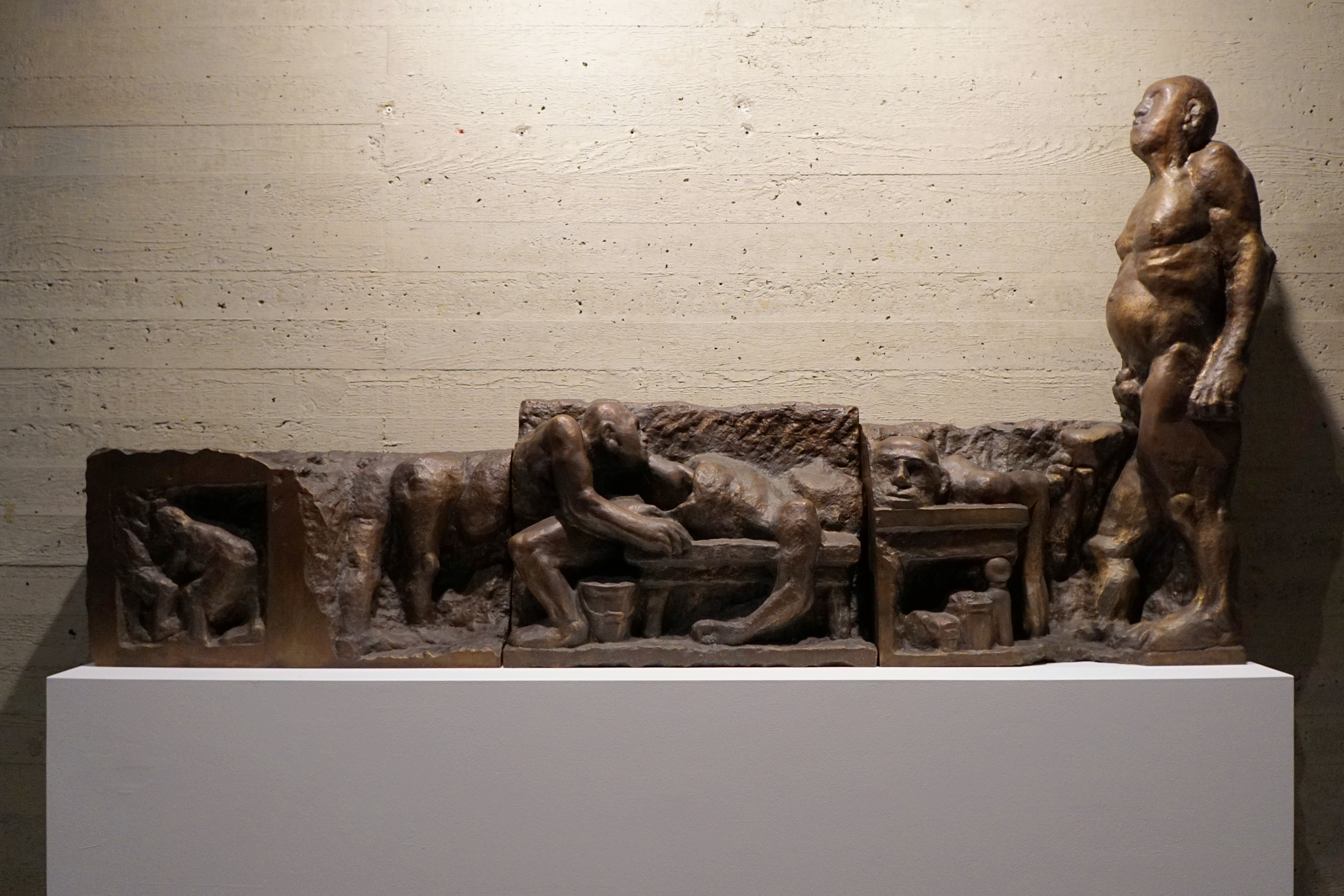
A bronze memorial depicting the crimes of Fritz Haarmann displayed at Sprengel Museum

Besides Schwitters and de Saint Phalle, the Sprengel Museums's key works include those of Max Ernst, Fernand Léger, Paul Klee, Pablo Picasso, Emil Nolde, and Max Beckmann from before 1945.

It also has a monument depicting the crimes of serial killer Fritz Haarmann.

In 1988, the museum inherited the estate of the artists and married couple Robert Michel and Ella Bergmann-Michel. The museum publishes a printed inventory of this estate, of which two volumes have so far been published. Since 1993, the Sprengel Museum has contained the Kurt Schwitters Archive, of which the Merz Room is particularly notable. In 2000, Niki de Saint Phalle became an honorary citizen of Hanover and subsequently donated 300 of her works to the museum.

== Restitution of Nazi-looted art ==
in June 2000, the museum voted to return the Lovis Corinth painting The Walchensee on St John's eve (Walchensee, Johannisnacht) to the heirs of Gustav Kirstein and his wife Therese Clara Stein, who were persecuted by Nazis because of their Jewish heritage.
