= Sarotti =

German brand of chocolate

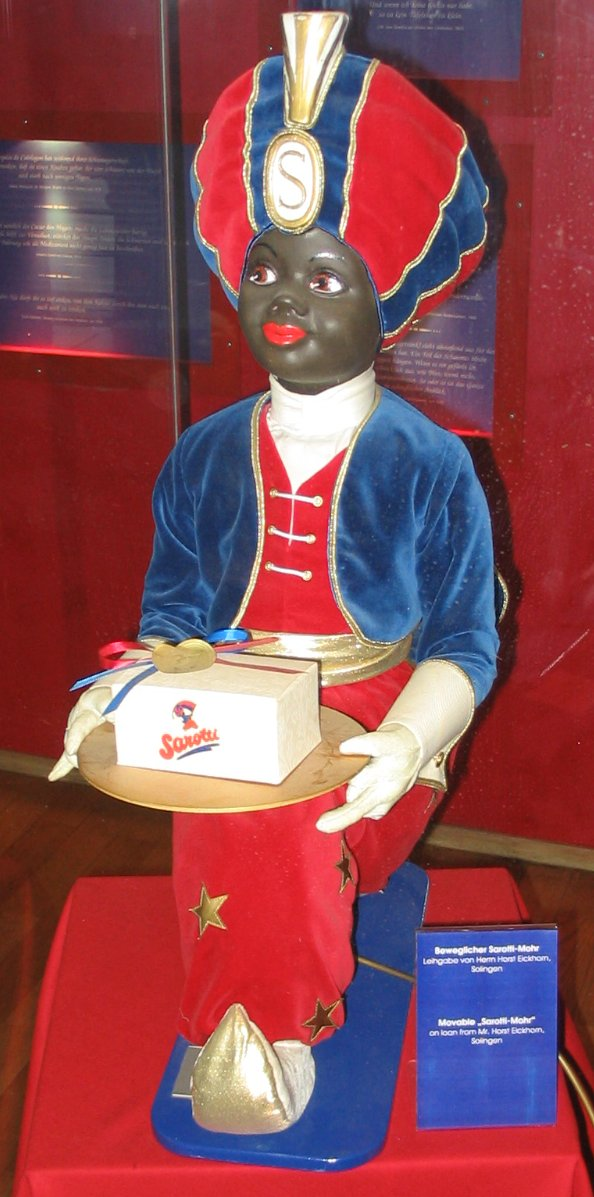
The Sarotti-Mohr from 1918, in the company museum

Sarotti is a German chocolate brand owned by Stollwerck GmbH since 1998.

== History ==
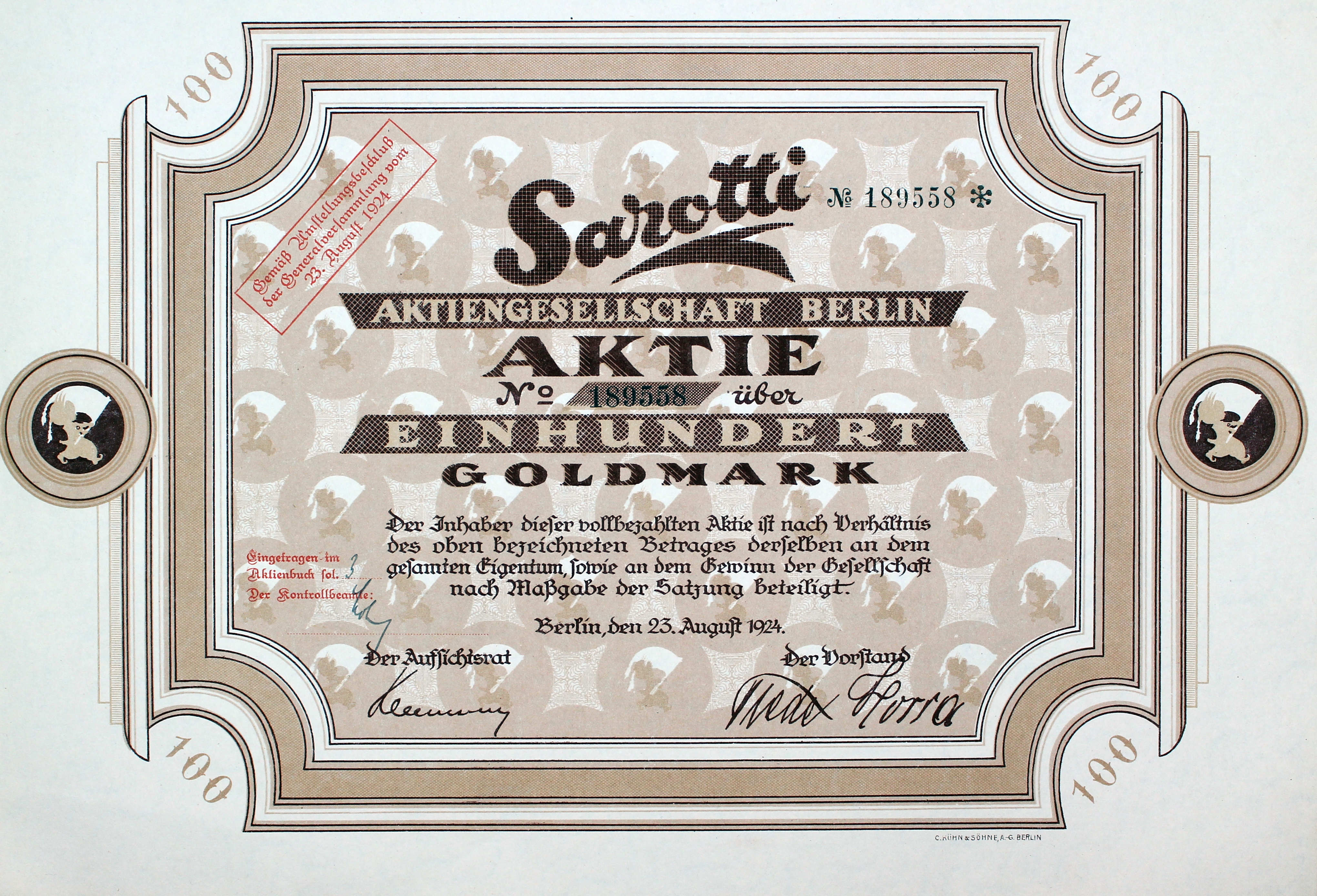
Share of the Sarotti AG, issued 23. August 1924

Berlin

In 1868 Hugo Hoffmann opened a company to produce sweets. The location of this shop was in Mohrenstraße 10 in Berlin. The industrial chocolate production took place on Mehringdamm No. 57 (then Belle-Alliance-Str. 81) since 1881, extended by Mehringdamm No. 55 in 1903 (then Belle-Alliance-Str. 82) and Mehringdamm No. 53 in 1906 (then Belle-Alliance-Str. 83). In 1913 the factory moved into a new building on Teilestraße 13–15 in Tempelhof, now part of Berlin.

Hattersheim

Another industrial chocolate production of Sarotti took place in Hattersheim in Hesse. With the change of the majority stockholding the factory merged to Nestlé. The factory in Hattersheim was in the 1960s one of the biggest companies in Hattersheim and Main-Taunus district with a workforce up to 2,000 workers. The factory was closed down in 1994 and has been officially designated a historic site by Hesse.

The Sarotti-Mohr

The Sarotti-Mohr was created in 1918 by the German artist Julius Gipkens to increase chocolate consumption after chocolate production had decreased with World War 1. It is a blackamoor figure, dressed in brightly colored and detailed clothes: a turban, bloomers and poulaines. It was featured on chocolate bars and blocks and was very popular. Its appearance was that of a child, with a cute and non-threatening appearance, containing stereotypes of black people. Initially, three were created, but they were reduced to one in 1922. Gipkens was commissioned to create the icon for Sarotti's 50 year anniversary. Multiple inspirations have been given for the creation of the figure; Gipkens cites Sarotti's location on what translates from German as Blackamoore Street, while academic Silke Hackenesch notes that depictions of black slaves and servants were then common.

The Nazis had an ambivalent attitude toward the Sarotti-Mohr, considering its exotic appearance to be un-German, but appreciating its references to colonialism. During the Nazi-era, despite being featured alongside a swastika on some packaging, it was not visible in public as chocolate was not commonly consumed. During the period after WWII, the figure was very popular. In some fairs, Afro-German children were employed to pose as what was referred to as a live Sarotti-Mohr. Particularly since the 1990s, the figure was subject to increased public scrutiny for racism.

In 1929 Nestlé became the majority stockholder in the company. This traditional German brand is only known in its home market. In 1998 Nestlé sold Sarotti to Stollwerck Chocolates.

In 2004, two years after Stollwerck was bought by the Swiss-Belgian company Barry Callebaut, a new icon was launched in reaction to criticism. The new figure, a "Magician of the Senses" with golden skin, is no longer holding chocolate, but juggling golden stars. The image remains reminiscent of the Sarotti Mohr.

== Sources ==
- Hackenesch, Silke (January 2014). "Advertising Chocolate, Consuming Race? On the Peculiar Relationship of Chocolate Advertising, German Colonialism, and Blackness". Food and History. 12 (1). doi:10.1484/J.FOOD.5.105144.
