= Severins Bridge =

Bridge

Severins Bridge Severinsbrücke
- Coordinates: 50.93081°N 6.96789°E
- Carries: Bundesstraße 55
- Locale: Cologne, Germany
- Official name: Severins Bridge (Severinsbrücke)
- Other name: Severin Bridge

History
- Construction end: 1959

Location
- Interactive map of Severins Bridge

The Severins Bridge (sometimes Severin Bridge, German Severinsbrücke) is a cable-stayed bridge in Cologne, Germany. The Severins Bridge opened in 1959,and was the first complete new bridge building in Cologne after the Second World War. The cable-stayed bridge connects the Severinsviertel via the Rhine and the Rhine port with the district of Cologne-Deutz on the right bank of the Rhine as well as the inner-city car traffic with the Ring Roads on the right bank of the Rhine (zuerst Gotenring) and long-distance roads, especially the B 55 and the A 59. The Stadtbahn lines 3 and 4 have a special railway body with the mutual stops Severinstraße and Suevenstraße.

== History ==
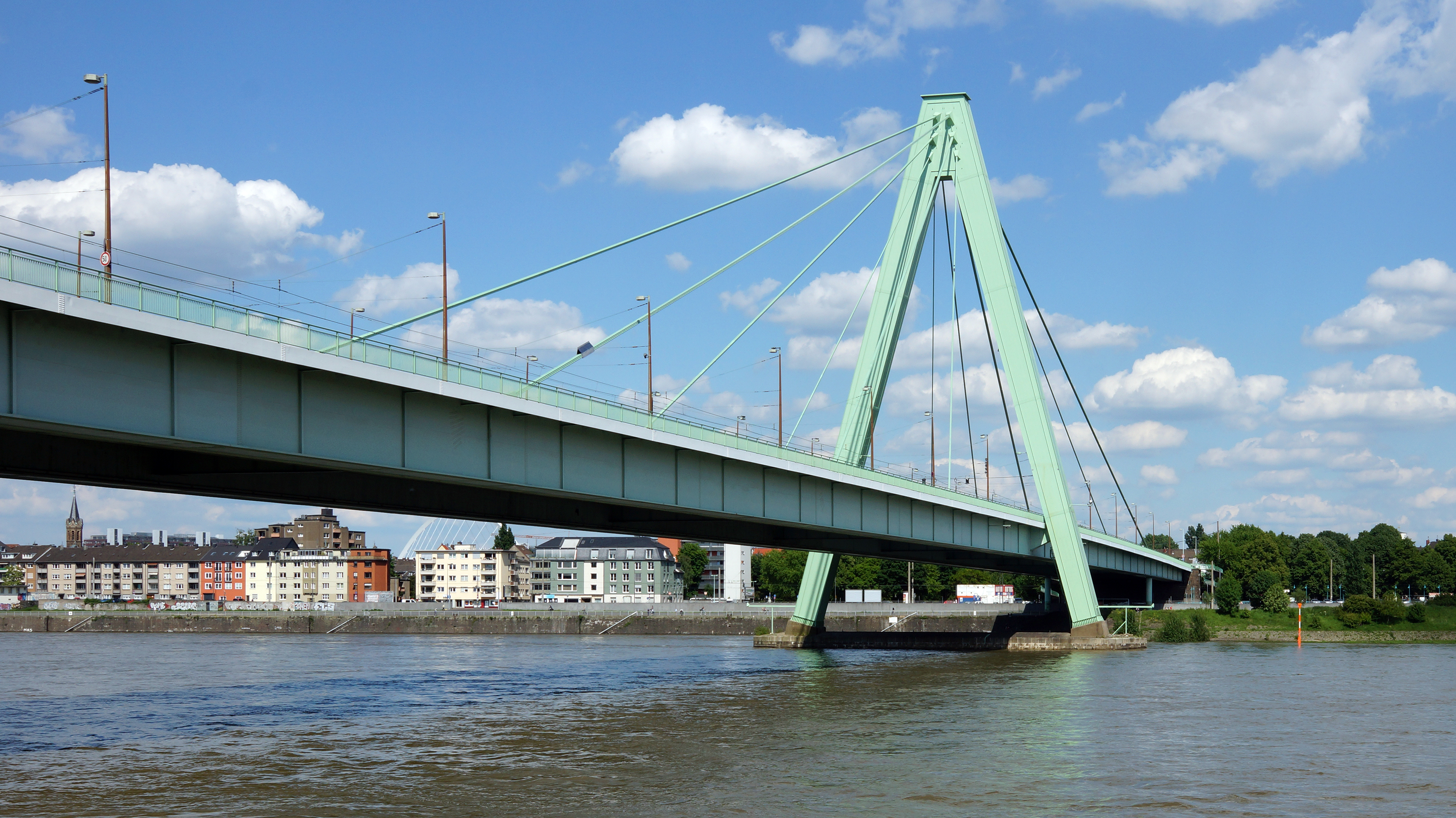
Severins Bridge in Cologne, Germany

The general traffic plan, which was adopted by the city in 1956, provided for Nord-Süd-DurchbruchNord-Süd-Fahrttwo new Rhine bridges, which had already begun before the war, two new Rhine bridges to be built before the war. The Severins Bridge was the first new bridge location after the reconstruction or new construction of five Cologne Rhine bridges. During the construction preparation happened on 21. September 1956 an accident, when the counter-insect for the foundation of the bridge pillar was in imbalance and at least five workers were fatally injured.

The bridge was built from 1958/59 according to the plans of the Gutehoffnungshütte and the Cologne bridge architect Gerd Lohmer, who had been changed based on the proposals of the renowned bridge construction engineer Fritz Leonhardt. Am 7. It was inaugurated in November 1959 in the presence of Federal Chancellor Konrad Adenauer by Cardinal Josef Frings and opened Lord Mayor Theo Burauen. The special feature of the bridge is that it does with only one asymmetrically provided A-shaped pylon, on which the bridge body is suspended with steel cables. Only in this way did the Deutzer port remain available for coastal motor vessels. In addition, the pylon, which is close to the right bank, had the view of the cathedral and the old town on the left bank of the Rhine largely undisturbed. Like the other urban bridges, it is painted in the bridge green of Cologne. Since 1989, the bridge has been listed as a historic monument.

== Construction ==
he Severins bridge is a cable-stayed beam bridge with a length of 691 metres and a width of 29.50 metres. The largest span is 302 metres long. The pylon protrudes 77,2 m beyond the bridge's foundation. A total of 8,300 tonnes of steel were used. The construction costs were 25.3 million Deutschmarks. At its opening, it was the cable-stayed bridge with the longest main span in the world and the first with an A-shaped pylon. The October Bridge, completed in 1979, has a similar one, which crosses the Sheksna in the Russian Cheerpove and reminds the construction of the Severins bridge. Also completed in 1979, the Danube bridge Steyregg (also called Steyreggerbrücke) in Linz an der Donau (Austria), which also has a similar construction of the pylon.

Due to the special rigidity of the construction, trams on rat rails could also drive over the bridge. Since the conversion from 1979/80, the light railways have been driving on its own track body. In 2014, it was decided to strengthen the bridge in the area of the main beam boxes and in the pylon with hot-dip galvanized U-profiles. Since these are not visible from the outside, the appearance of the bridge remained unchanged.

The building received the Cologne architecture prize in 1967, not least due to its innovative construction.

== Design ==
The Severins bridge crosses – from west to east – the four-lane quay quay shore road, whose customs port is called the electricity-based building, the Rhine, the entrance to Deutzer Hafen and Siegburger Straße. The center distances of the corresponding openings are 49,11 + 89,13 + 47,81 + 301,67 + 150.68 + 52.46 m. The bridge is bordered by abutments clad in natural stone, which are enclosed by spiral staircases. On both sides, even longer ramp bridges are included until the respective ascents.

The bridge deck is 29.50 m wide between the railings and divided into the tracks for the two light rail tracks, two lanes each and 2.25 m wide cycle paths and 3.00 m wide sidewalks. Measured from outside edge to outside edge, the bridge deck is 30.10 m wide.

The superstructure consists of two steel hollow boxes, 3.20 m wide, whose height decreases from a maximum of 4.57 m to the abutments at 3.00 m. They are stiffened by cross-panes. Between the hollow boxes is an orthotropic plate with a central longitudinal rib and regular cross ribs. The hollow box beams are attached to the angle ropes above the two main openings; they are supported by narrow, round pillars above the side openings.

The riveted pylon posts are enclosed for architectural reasons of profiles and are finished with a roof panel. They have a distance of 42.12 m on their foundation plate. In the lateral bridge view, the posts taper from 4.17 m to 3.36 m on the head of the pylon, while in the longitudinal view of 3.72 m at the foot widen to 4.60 m on the pylon head.

The 4 x 3 support cables have a rectangular cross-section, unlike what is usual, which indicates that it consists of 4 or 12 or 16 fully closed ropes. In the outer, stronger supporting cables, the upper ropes are anchored in the pylon head, while the lower ropes are carried out via a saddle bearing through the pylon head.

== Artwork ==
On the 22nd place In March 1997, an art installation by the Cologne action artist HA Schult was Michael Zilzassembled by the Cologne action artist HA Schult on the pylon of the Severins Bridge from a helicopter. It was a globe, which according to the patterns of longitude and width were designed as a filigree grid construction, on which neon lights in the form of the continents were attached in different colours. In addition, the sphere's only outgrowth of the sphere shaped a red neonfigured in a euphoric pose from the location in Cologne.

The art installation planned for a few months was ]extended despite the controversial public discussion and rejection by the Mayor of Cologne, Norbert Burger. On the 15th October 2000 the constructively revised world sphere was flown by helicopter from the Severins bridge to its current location on the roof of the DEVK headquarters on the left bank of the Rhine next to the Zoobrücke.
