= Bernhard Sprengel =

German chocolate manufacturer and art collector

Bernhard Sprengel (17 April 1899 – 22 January 1985) was a German chocolate manufacturer and modern art collector.

== Life ==
Sprengel studied at the Goethe school and later took courses in political science. In May 1919 he became one of the first new members of the Corps Holsatia following the First World War. Then, after completing commercial training in Hamburg, he took over the management of the chocolate factory B. Sprengel & Co. in Hanover.

Bernhard Sprengel had already developed a passion for 20th-century art and he had begun a private collection of paintings and sculpture, including works by Picasso, Chagall, Macke, Beckmann, Marc, Klee and Feininger. Some of these works were Nazi plunder, sourced via art dealer Hildebrand Gurlitt.

On the occasion of his 70th birthday in 1969, Bernhard Sprengel donated his complete collection of the city of Hanover and made 2.5 million marks available for the building of a museum. The Sprengel Museum was opened ten years later in 1979. In recognition of his contribution, the city of Hanover appointed Bernhard Sprengel an honorary citizen in 1977.
