= Rheinauhafen =

Coordinates: 50°55′43″N 6°57′51″E

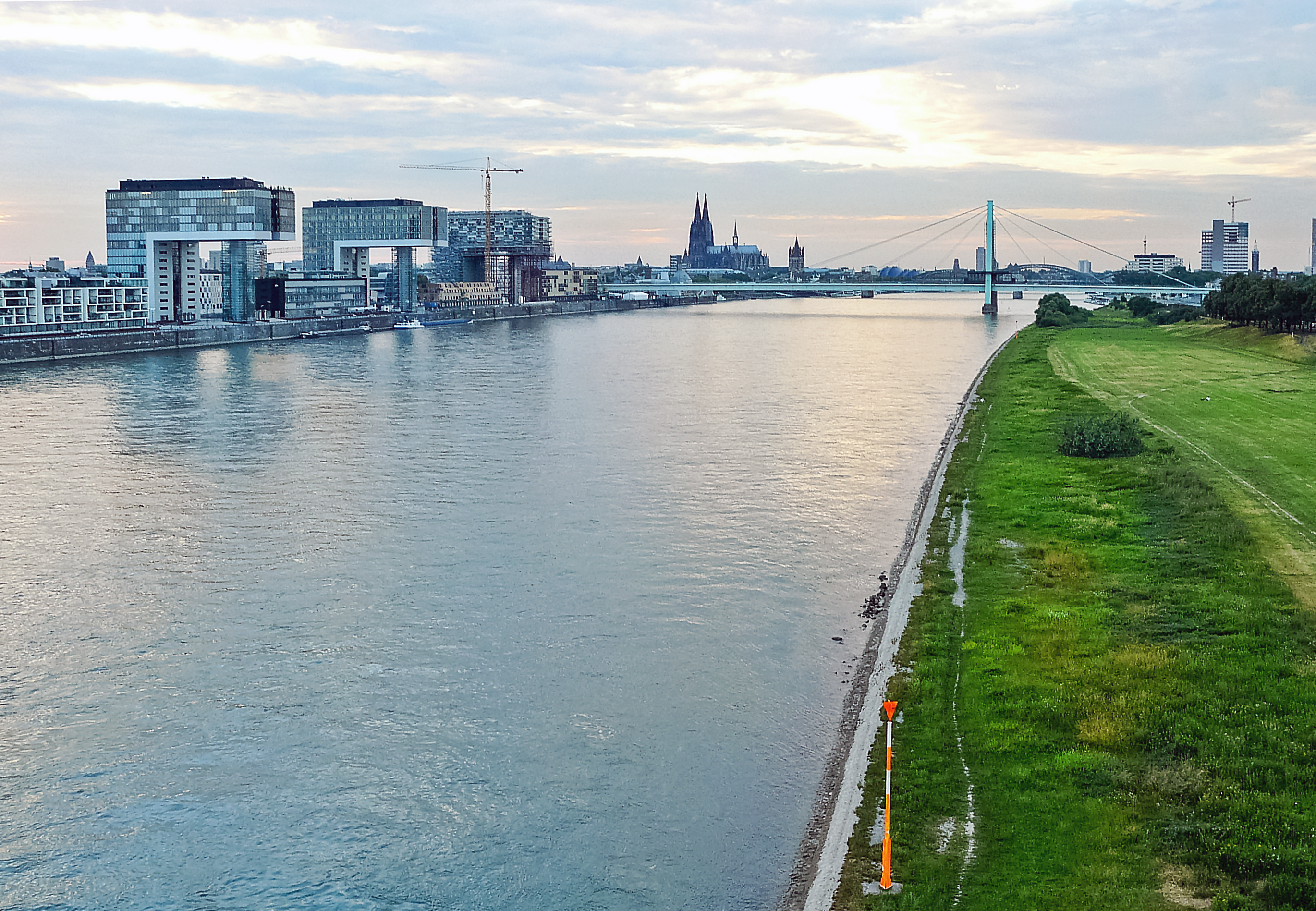
Rheinauhafen (left) as seen from the South: two of the three Kranhäuser already completed, "Kranhaus1" and "KranhausPLUS", designed by Hadi Teherani. In the background: Severin Bridge and Cologne Cathedral.

The Rheinauhafen (German pronunciation: [ˈʁaɪnaʊˌhaːfn̩], lit. 'Rheinau harbour') is a 15.4 hectares (38 acres) urban regeneration project in Cologne, Germany, located along the river Rhine between the Südbrücke (Southern Railway Bridge) and Severinsbrücke (Severin Bridge), just south of the inner city's historic old town.

The project is set around the actual Rheinauhafen, a formerly commercial harbour developed during the 1880s, and spans 2 kilometres (1.2 mi) in the north-south direction and 200 metres (660 ft) east-west at its widest. Planning for the redevelopment project commenced with an urban design competition during the early 1990s, with construction starting in 2002 and scheduled to be completed by 2011. The project comprises some 15.4 hectares (38 acres) of waterfront land mainly used for offices, cultural institutions, hotels and dwellings. The formerly commercial port is now being used as a marina. Architectural landmarks are the former Siebengebirge wharf warehouses and the three Kranhaus buildings (from south to north "KranhausPLUS", "Kranhaus1" and "Pandion Vista"), allegorizing the historical harbour cranes. The middle one ("Kranhaus1") was awarded the MIPIM Award in Cannes on March 12, 2009 in the category of Best Business Centre.

The new Rheinauhafen is home to numerous companies of the creative industry; among the larger companies and law firms are Freshfields Bruckhaus Deringer (in "KranhausPLUS"), CMS Hasche Sigle (in "Kranhaus1"), Electronic Arts (own building) and Microsoft (own building); among the cultural organisations are the Kap am Südkai, German Sport & Olympia Museum and Imhoff-Schokoladenmuseum.
