= Schwarzwald family =

Polish noble family

Schwarzwald Schwarzwaldt
- Noble family
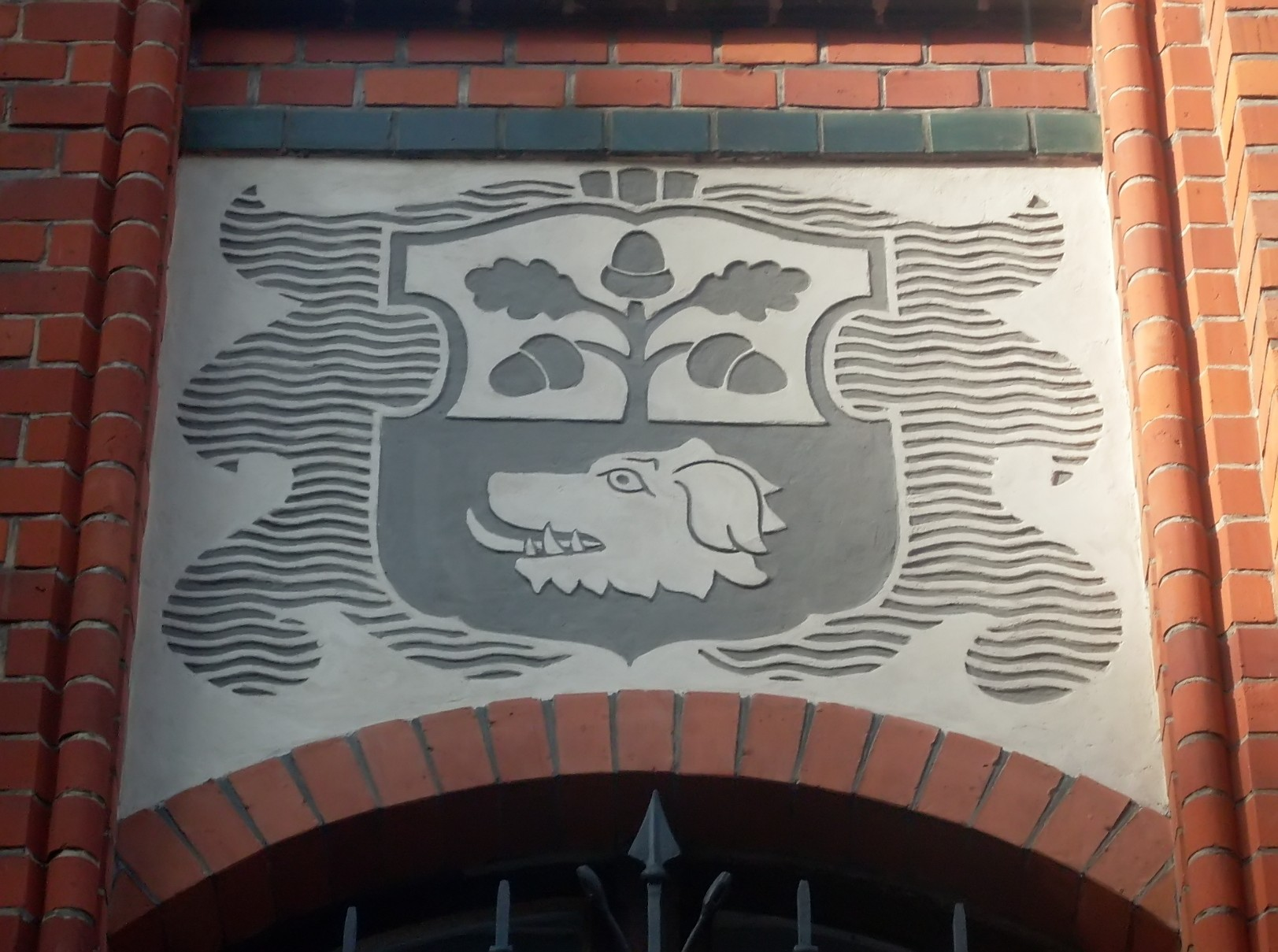
- Schwarzwald Coat of Arms at Gdańsk Library of Polish Academy of Sciences
- Country: Kingdom of Poland
- Etymology: Schwarzwald (German): "black forest"
- Origin: Black Forest, south-west Germany
- Founded: 1556
- Founder: Heinrich II von Schwarzwald
- Historic seat: Danzig
- Connected families: Reesen, Schachmann

The Schwarzwald (or von Schwarzwald) family was a wealthy, patrician, merchant family living in the Hanseatic city of Danzig from the 15th to the 18th century. The family, which had its origins in the Black Forest in south-west Germany, can be traced back to Georg von Schwarzwald, who settled in Danzig in the early 1400s.

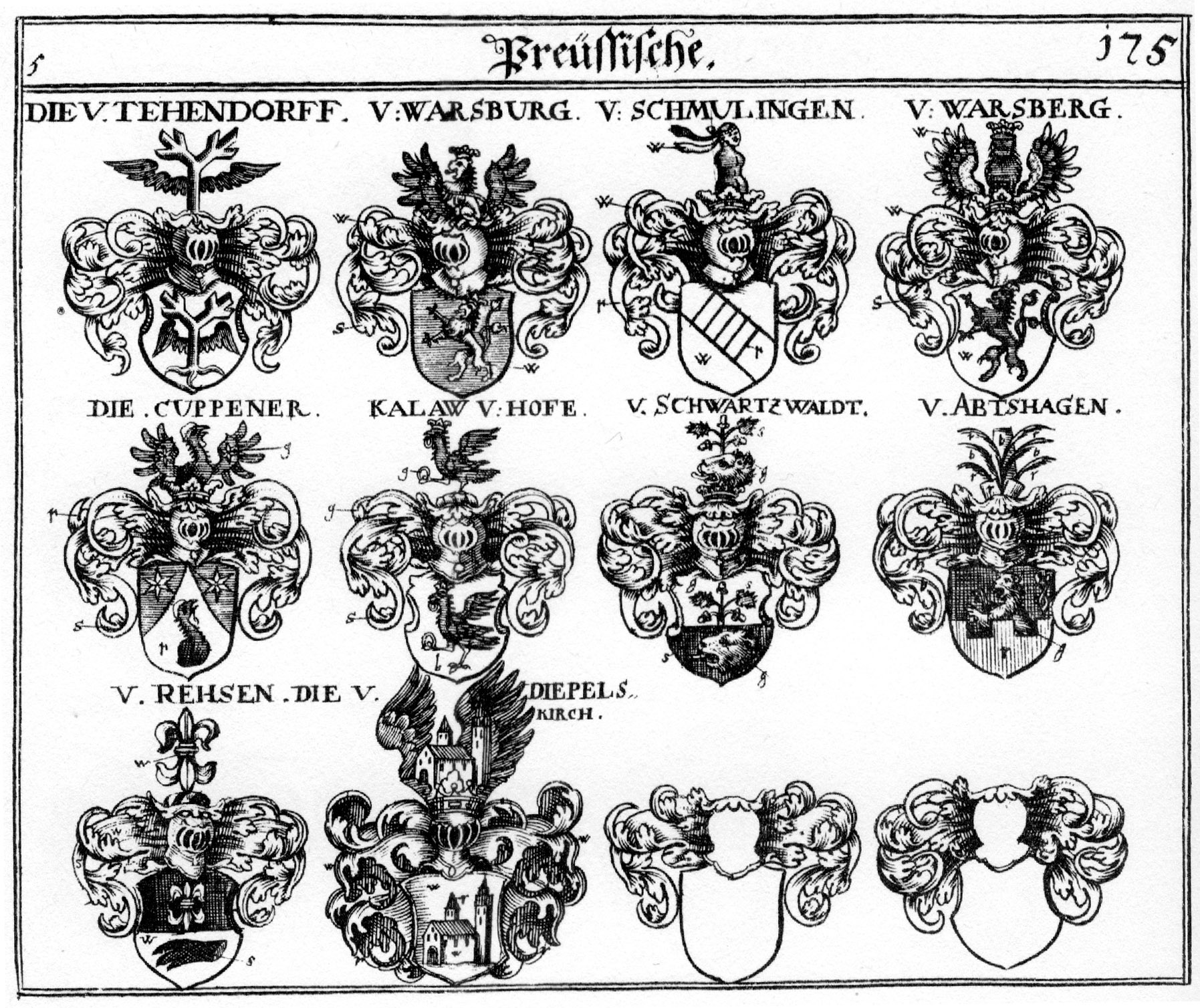
Siebmacher's Wappenbuch bd. 5., S. 175

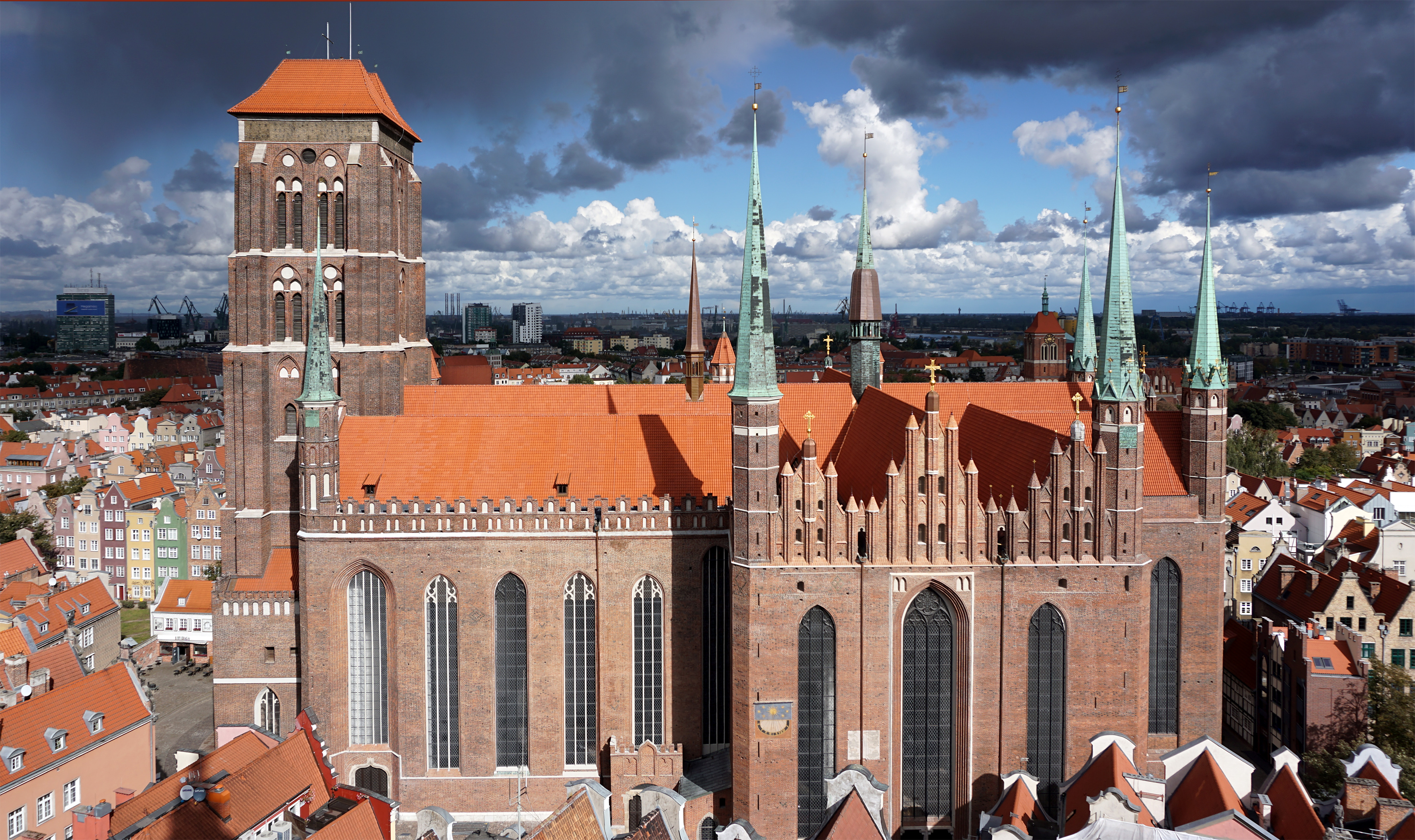
St. Mary's Church, Gdańsk

== Notable members ==
Notable members of the family include:

=== Hans I (Johann) Schwarzwald (1468–1521) ===
Hans I (Johann) von Schwarzwald (1468–1521), merchant, juror in 1504, alderman from 1514 in Danzig.

He married as his first wife:

- Catherina Cölmer, in 1499;

He married as his second wife:

- Margarethe Cölmer, in 1509, by whom he had five children including:
  - Hans II (Johann) von Schwarzwald (13 June 1513−1575) died unmarried. He is said to have been the subject of a portrait by Hans Holbein the Younger;

He married as his third wife:

- Margarethe (b. 1490), in 1516, daughter of Bernd von Reesen (d. 1506) and Brigitte Proite (d. 1506), sister of Bernhard von Reesen, by whom he had eight children, including:

- Heinrich II von Schwarzwald (8 July 1517−1561), merchant, juror; married, in 1540, Brigitte Köseler (1522−1586) by whom he had six children, including:

- Catharina von Schwarzwald (1542–1599) married 1. Mathias Zimmermann (d. 1556); 2. Michael Kerl (1542–1586) by whom she had a son, Ernest Kerl and 3. Bartholomeus von Schachman (1559–1614), Mayor of Danzig.
- Johann III von Schwarzwald (1544–1608), merchant.
Heinrich II was ennobled by Charles V in 1556 and is said to have been the subject of a portrait by Hans Holbein the Younger. He died 19 December 1561 and was buried in the Reesen chapel of St. Mary's church in Danzig.

- Berend von Schwarzwald (21 September 1519–1548) died unmarried, buried in St. Mary's church in Danzig.
- Margarethe von Schwarzwald, married, by 1549, Roger Watson, merchant of London, brother of William Watson (d. 1559), cloth-merchant of London and from 1538, Henry VIII's agent in Danzig.

- William Watson (b. 2 February 1550)
- Roger Watson

=== Heinrich IV Schwarzwald (1619–1672) ===
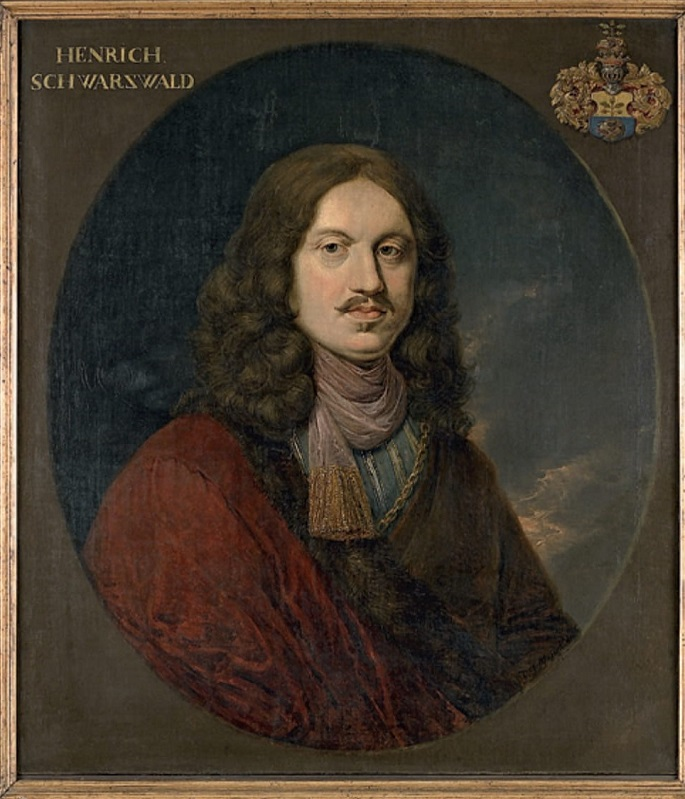
Heinrich Schwarzwald, 1669, after Andreas Stech (PAS Gdańsk Library)

Heinrich IV Schwarzwald (1619–1672), great-grandson of Heinrich II Schwarzwald (1517−1561), was a merchant and collector of books, coins and art. He studied law at the University of Groningen in 1640; juror, 1650, letter of nobility, 1658.

On 11 September 1650 he married Konstancja Cölmer (1626–1657) by whom he had two children:

- Konstancja Schwarzwald (3 January 1652 – 2 February 1684)
- Heinrich Schwarzwald, born 10 December 1655 and died soon after his baptism.

In his home at Langgasse (35 Długa Street), he built a library with over three thousand volumes of manuscripts, incunabula and prints, including numerous Polish books. In 1669, he bequeathed the library to the church of Saints Peter and Paul in Danzig.

He died 24 June 1672 and was buried in St. Mary's church, Danzig.

A portrait of Heinrich IV, Heinrich Schwarzwald, 1669, after Andreas Stech is in the collection of the PAS Gdańsk Library. The portrait of Heinrich Schwarzwald IV (1619–1672) was incorporated into the PAS Gdańsk Library's collection in 1832. Heinrich Schwarzwald IV was the founder of the book collection for the Petrischule in Gdańsk. Both the book collection and the portrait were donated to the school at St. Peter and Paul Church after the death of Heinrich Schwarzwald IV's nephew, Heinrich Schwarzwald V, in 1708.

=== Heinrich V Schwarzwald (1642–1705) ===
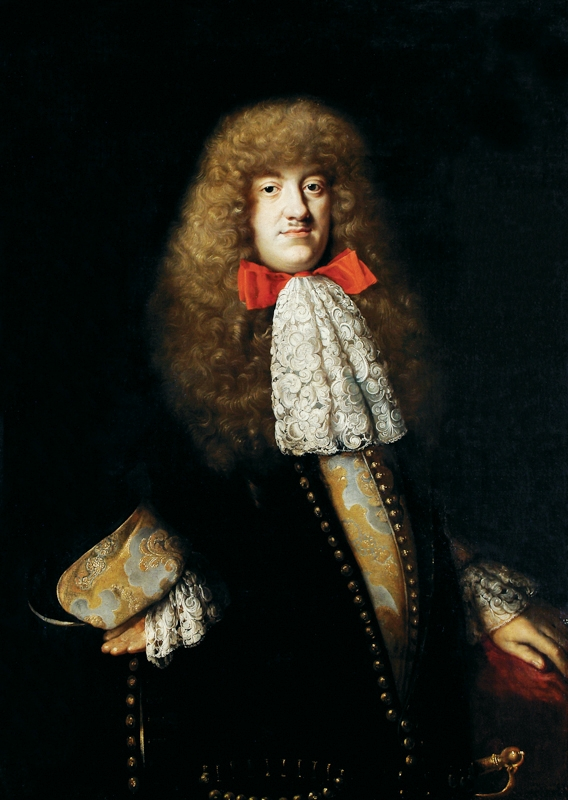
Portrait of Heinrich Schwarzwaldt (1642-1705), 1682, by Andreas Stech (National Museum, Gdańsk)

Heinrich V Schwarzwald (1642–1705), nephew of Heinrich IV, studied at Leiden University, 1663, councillor, 1691, married in 1677, Maria von Heemskirk (1648–1711). His portrait, Portrait of Heinrich Schwarzwaldt (1642-1705), counsellor of Gdańsk, dated 1682, by Andreas Stech is displayed in the National Museum, Gdańsk.

A portrait miniature of a young man at the age of 24 in 1543, Portrait of Johann von Schwarzwaldt, by Hans Holbein the Younger, formed part of a legacy to the church of Saints Peter and Paul in 1708. It was looted from the National Museum, Gdańsk in 1943 by the German occupation forces in 1943, then claimed by the Soviet Union's Red Army as spoils of war in 1945. The portrait, now at the Pushkin State Museum of Fine Arts in Moscow, is one of a number of works of art subject to restitution requests by the Polish government.

== Portrait miniatures by Hans Holbein ==
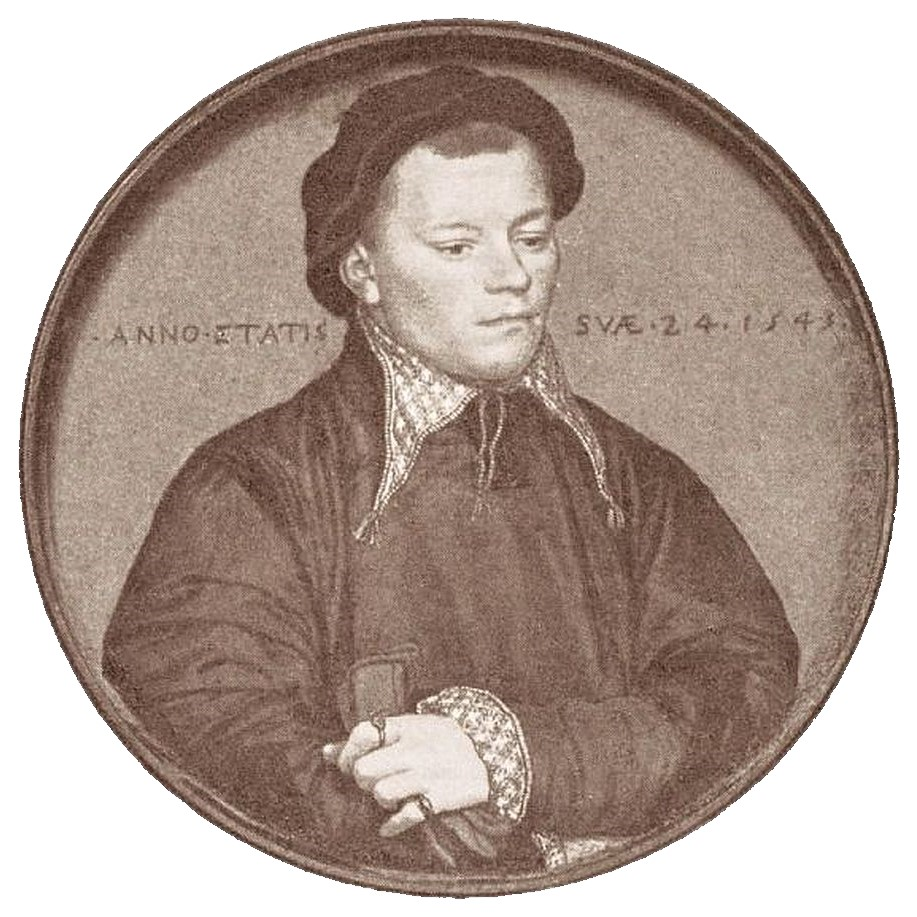
Portrait of a Man Aged 24, 1543 called Portrait of Johann von Schwarzwaldt, by Hans Holbein the Younger

In 1913 German art historian Georg Habich discovered a portrait miniature of an unidentified young man by Hans Holbein the Younger in the Danzig Stadtmuseum (now the National Museum, Gdańsk). The miniature was first recorded in the museum's collection in 1902. There was a tradition in Danzig that the subject was a member of the old, prosperous, Schwarzwald family. In 1708, after the male line of the Schwarzwald family had died out, the portrait, together with a library and a coin collection, was part of a legacy left to the church of Saints Peter and Paul in Danzig. The inscription — ANNO ETATIS // SVÆ 24 1543 — indicates that the sitter was twenty-four in 1543 and consequently born circa 1519. The sitter has hooded eyes and a turned up nose; his clothing is English, with a pointed tasselled collar as seen in English portraits of the period, for example, Portrait of a man, probably Sir George Carew (c.1540). The portrait was looted from the Danzig Stadtmuseum by the German occupation forces in 1943, then claimed by the Soviet Union's Red Army as spoils of war in 1945. The portrait, now at the Pushkin State Museum of Fine Arts in Moscow, is one of a number of works of art subject to restitution requests by the Polish government.

Habich identified the sitter as the merchant, Heinrich von Schwarzwald (8 July 1517−1561), the eldest son of Hans I (Johann) von Schwarzwald by his third wife, Margarethe von Reesen, but Heinrich's age does not match the inscription, and the "Z or very widely placed N" on the signet ring does not correspond to his merchant's mark or the Schwarzwald coat of arms. None of the Steelyard merchants who were painted by Holbein have a merchant's mark on a signet ring, only a coat of arms: for example, The Merchant George Gisze (1497-1562) (on the table) and Hermann von Wedigh III (died 1560) (on his index finger).

Hans Secker, the Director of the Danzig Stadtmuseum, claimed that by tradition the sitter was known as Johann von Schwarzwald, the eldest son of Hans I (Johann) von Schwarzwald by his second wife, Margarethe Cölmer, but Heinrich's older half-brother, who was born in 1513, is around six years older than the subject of the painting. Heinrich's younger brother, Berend, who reached the age of 24 only on 21 September in 1543, shortly before Holbein's death and during an outbreak of plague, is unlikely to be the sitter. In 1543 there was a "great death" in London, which lasted so far into the winter that the Michaelmas law term had to be kept at St. Albans. Another civic chronicle adds that there had been a great death in the summer before; and from an ordinance of the Privy Council it appears that the plague was in London as early as 21 May 1543. Hans Holbein died between 7 October, when he made his will at his home in Aldgate, and 29 November 1543, when John of Antwerp carried out the artist's last wishes.

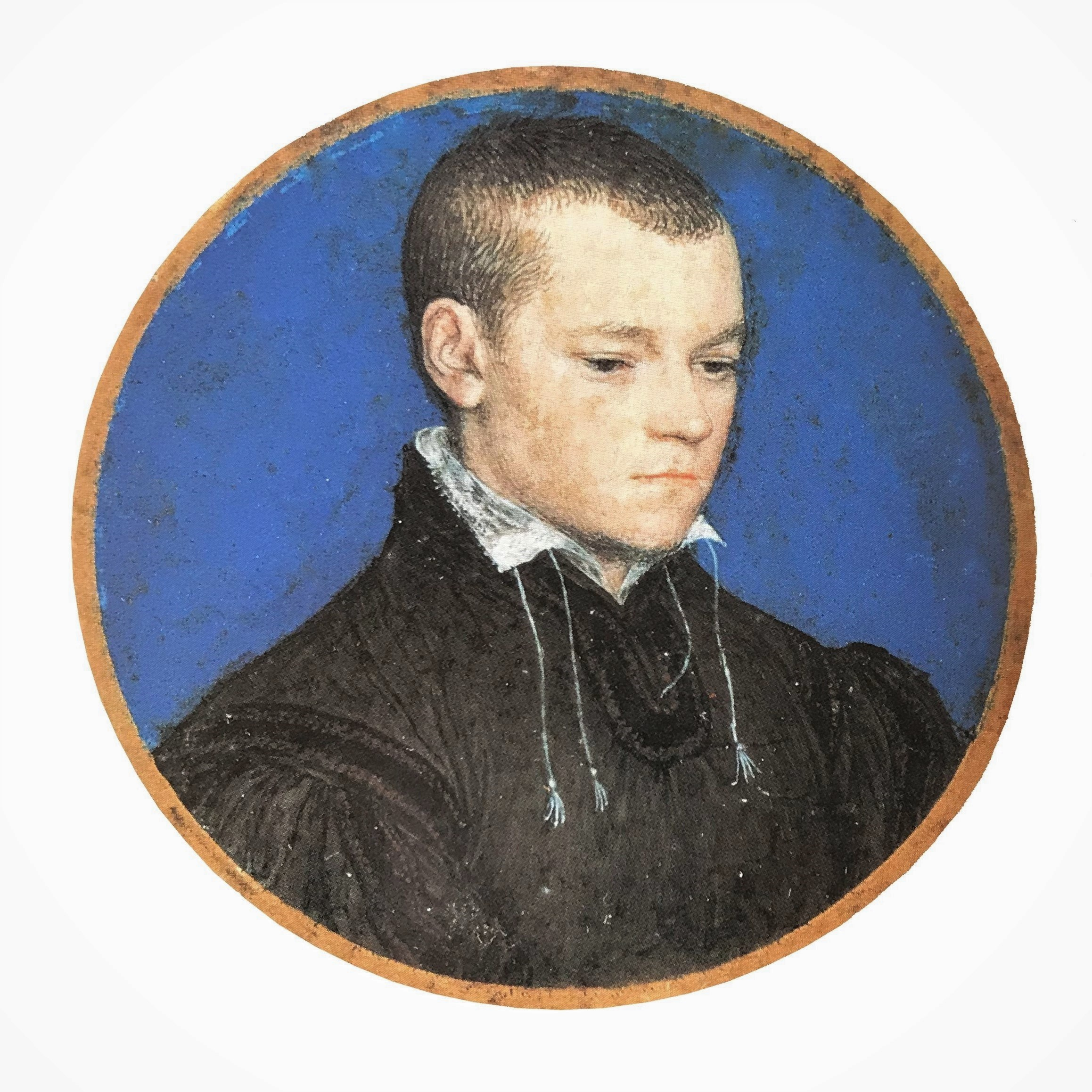
Portrait of a Young Man, c. 1535-40 called Portrait Miniature of Hans Schwarzwaldt, by Hans Holbein the Younger

In 1903 Sir Richard Holmes identified a portrait miniature of an unknown youth, one of a number of portrait miniatures of English origin in the possession of the Queen of the Netherlands, as the work of Hans Holbein the Younger. He suggested that the "youth apparently of fifteen or sixteen years of age" might possibly be one of the family of a Hanseatic merchant of the Steelyard in London "like the admirable head of Derek Born". The art historian Roy Strong has dated the portrait to c. 1535–1540.

The sitter has hooded eyes and his hair is close cropped as seen in Portrait of a man, probably Sir George Carew (c. 1540), Portrait of an Unknown Man, possibly identifiable as Thomas Seymour (c. 1535–1540) and Portrait of William Parr, Marquess of Northampton (c. 1538–1542). The sitter's clothing is distinctly English and George Williamson noted that "as it finds its place in a collection which includes many miniatures by English masters, such as Cooper, Oliver, and Hoskins, it may be thought possible that the picture was painted in England, and represents perhaps some young Englishman of notable position". In 1913 Arthur Chamberlain observed that his features "appear more English than German, and that it most probably represents the son of some personage about Henry's court."

In 2003 Quentin Buvelot, curator of the Mauritshuis, noted that "On the basis of the similarity of facial features and in particular the characteristic angle of the cropped hair, it could even be conjectured that the two portraits depict the same person." In the same year the sitter was identified as Hans II Schwarzwaldt (1513–1575), the son of merchant Hans I Schwarzwald (1468–1521), based on a very strong resemblance to the subject of the other portrait miniature painted by Holbein in 1543 and since only he was at that time in the Steelyard in London. Hans II (Johann), however, was 30 years of age in 1543, not 24.

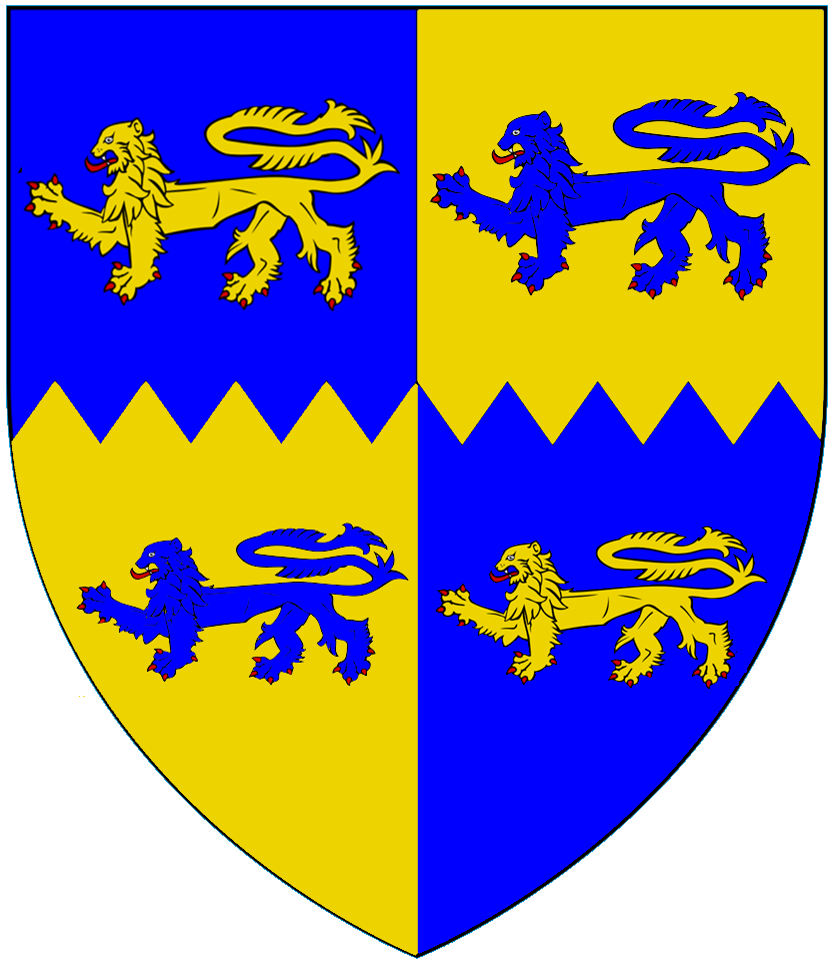
Coat of Arms of Gregory Cromwell, 1st Baron Cromwell

According to Roy Strong the existence of a second miniature indicates a sitter of exceptional importance: royal personages and near-relations. In 2016 Teri Fitzgerald and Diarmaid MacCulloch suggested that the sitter might be Henry VIII's brother-in-law, Gregory Cromwell (c.1520–1551), son of the king's chief minister, Thomas Cromwell. Gregory Cromwell married, in 1537, Elizabeth Seymour, the widow of Sir Anthony Ughtred (d. 1534) and a younger sister of Queen Jane Seymour, Henry VIII's third wife. The subsequent birth of a prince also meant he was an uncle to the future Edward VI. Gregory, who was born in or before 1520, was the right age and of suitable status to be the subject of the portraits. There is every likelihood that a miniature of Thomas's son Gregory would have been painted around the time of his marriage, "when both father and son had so much to celebrate." It is of interest to note that, in Cromwell's accounts for 1538, there is a payment on 4 January to "Hanns the painter, 40s."

The young man's features "have a distinct resemblance" to those of his father and he has the "same characteristic Cromwell upturned nose." The "Z or N detail on the signet ring" in the 1543 portrait can be accounted for by Gregory Cromwell's coat of arms, "if it is seen as a zig-zag, or in heraldic terms, a fess indented." Two portrait miniatures of Gregory's brother-in-law, Thomas Seymour, from the 1540s are extant:Thomas Seymour, Baron Seymour of Sudeley (c. 1545–1547) at the National Maritime Museum, London and Thomas Seymour, Baron Seymour of Sudeley, (c. 1540), attributed to Lucas Horenbout in the Royal Collections, The Hague.

The year 1543 is significant for two reasons: Henry VIII married his sixth wife, Catherine Parr and the "King's painter", Hans Holbein died. The portrait miniature of the 24-year-old man has a special significance in that it may have been the artist's last work.
