= Portrait of Johann von Schwarzwaldt =

Painting by Hans Holbein the Younger

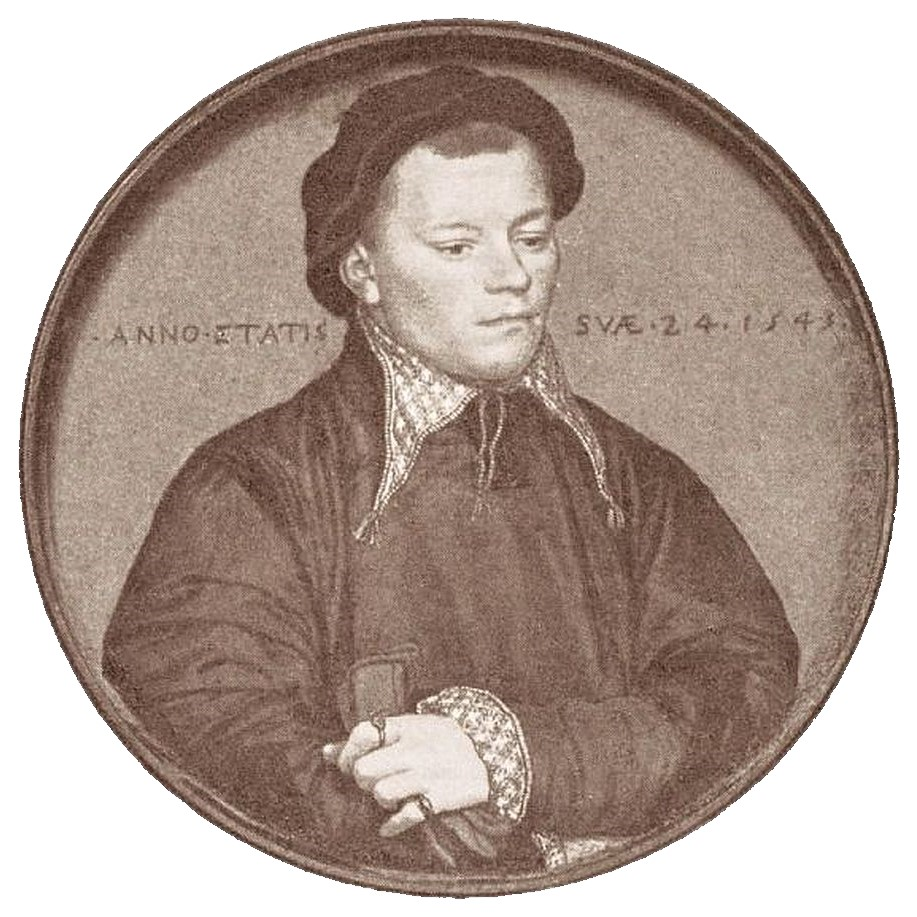
- Artist: Hans Holbein the Younger
- Year: 1543
- Medium: tempera on parchment
- Dimensions: 5.4 cm (2.1 in)
- Location: Pushkin State Museum of Fine Arts; Moscow
- Website: pushkinmuseum.art

Portrait of Johann von Schwarzwaldt is a tempera on parchment portrait completed in 1543 by German artist and printmaker, Hans Holbein the Younger. The painting shows a young man against a blue background, turned three-quarters to the viewer's right. The sitter is wearing a deep black velvet cap and a black silk gown, a shade lighter, with a finely embroidered white shirt showing at the neck and wrist. The eyes are lowered, half covered by the lids, the arms folded. He has two rings on his left hand and is holding leather gloves. There is a flanking inscription at head height —· ANNO · ETATIS // SVÆ · 24 · 1543· — indicating that he was born about 1519. The subject of this portrait was identified as a Danzig merchant, Hans (Johann) von Schwarzwald (1513 − 1575), but his age does not match the inscription. It has been suggested that the young man might be Gregory Cromwell, 1st Baron Cromwell, the son of Henry VIII's chief minister, Thomas Cromwell, 1st Earl of Essex.

== Identification ==
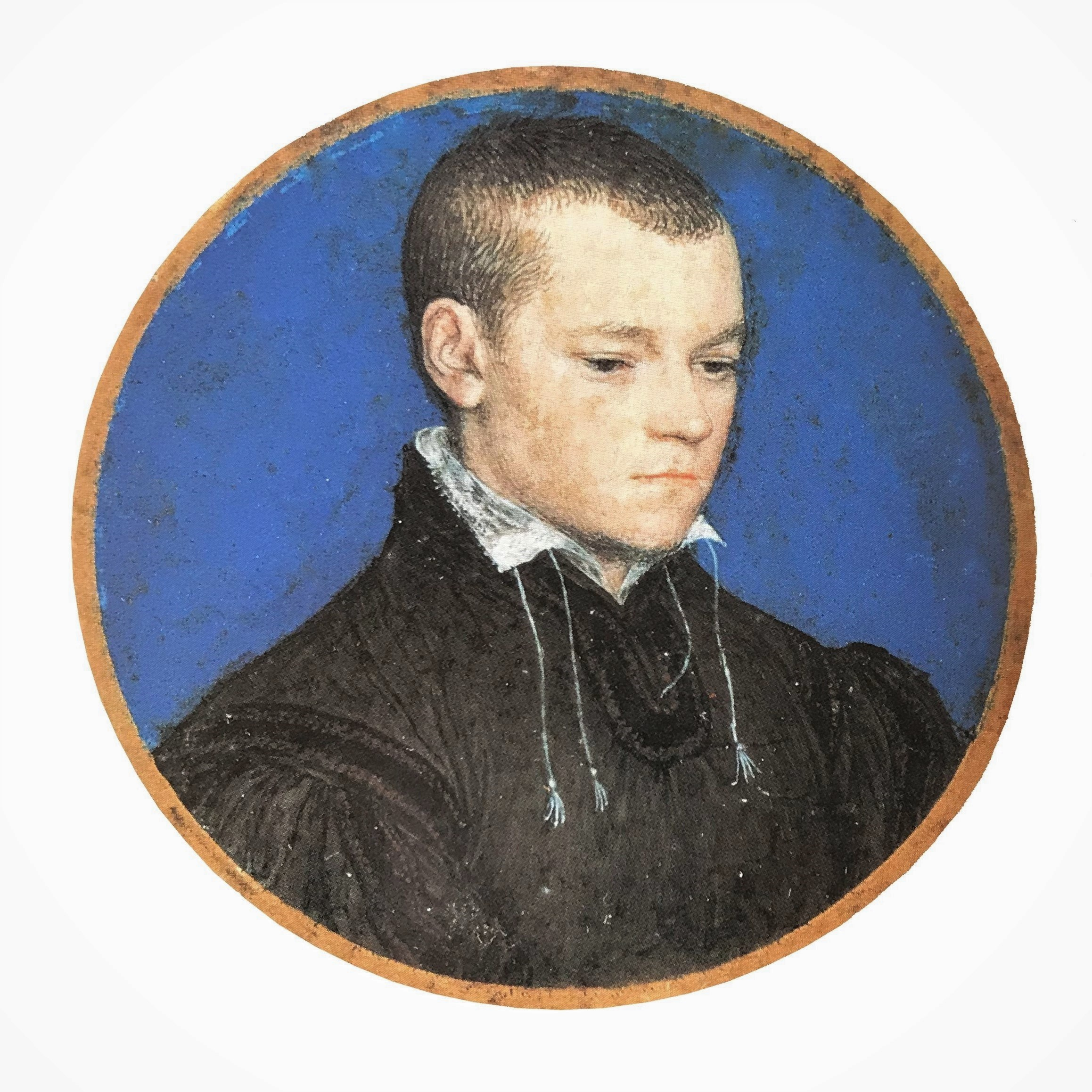
Portrait Miniature of Hans Schwarzwaldt, by Hans Holbein the Younger

In 1903 Sir Richard Holmes identified a portrait of a young man, one of a number of portrait miniatures of English origin in the possession of the Queen of the Netherlands, as the work of Hans Holbein the Younger. He suggested that the unidentified youth "apparently of fifteen or sixteen years of age" might possibly be one of the family of a Hanseatic merchant of the Steelyard in London "like the admirable head of Derek Born". Art historian Roy Strong has dated the portrait to c. 1535–1540.

The sitter has hooded eyes and his hair is close cropped as seen in Portrait of a man, probably Sir George Carew (c. 1540), Portrait of an Unknown Man, possibly identifiable as Thomas Seymour (c. 1535–1540) and Portrait of William Parr, Marquess of Northampton (c. 1538–1542). The sitter's clothing is distinctly English and George Williamson noted that "as it finds its place in a collection which includes many miniatures by English masters, such as Cooper, Oliver, and Hoskins, it may be thought possible that the picture was painted in England, and represents perhaps some young Englishman of notable position". Arthur Chamberlain observed that his features "appear more English than German, and that it most probably represents the son of some personage about Henry's court."

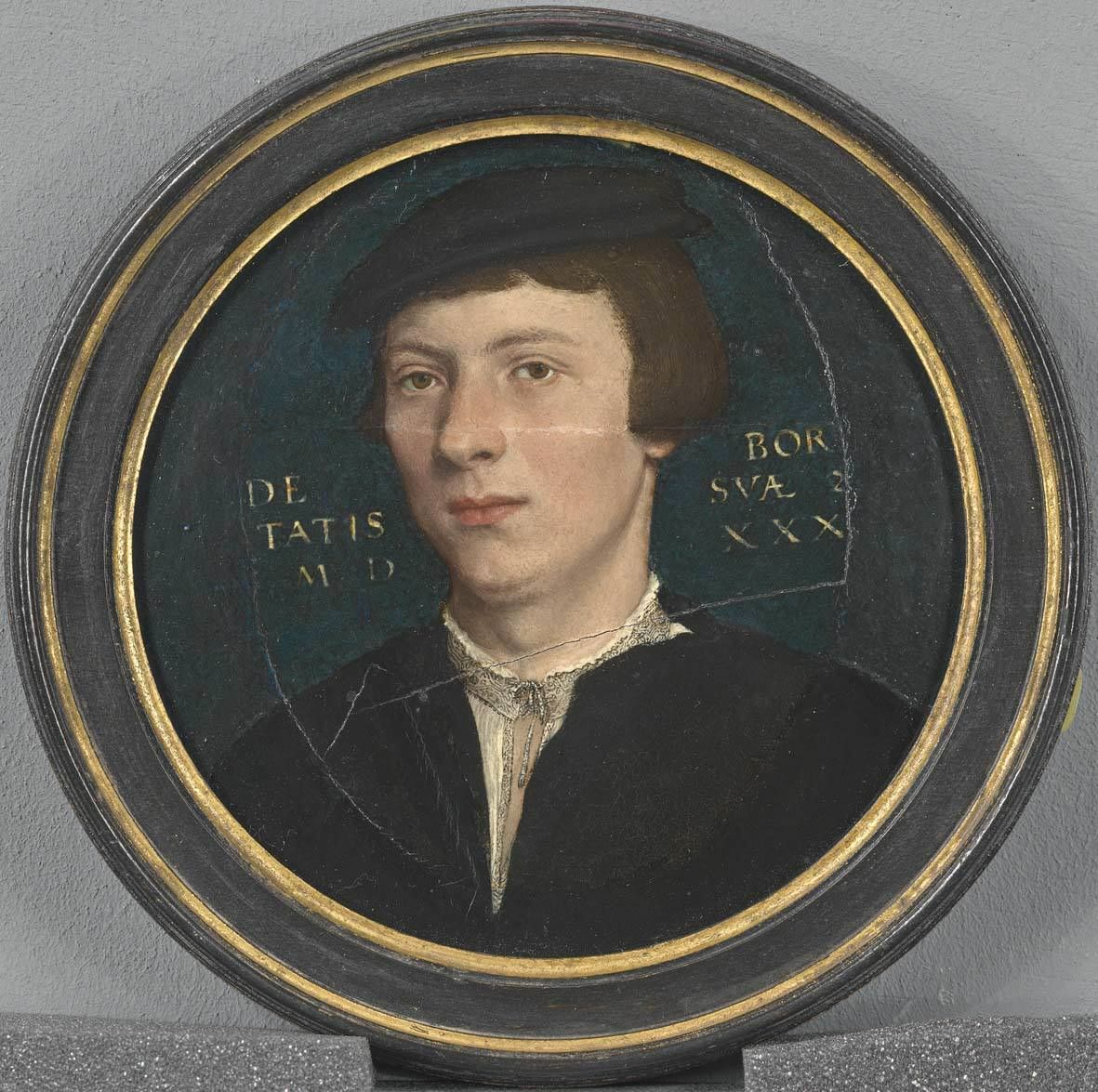
Derich Born, c. 1533

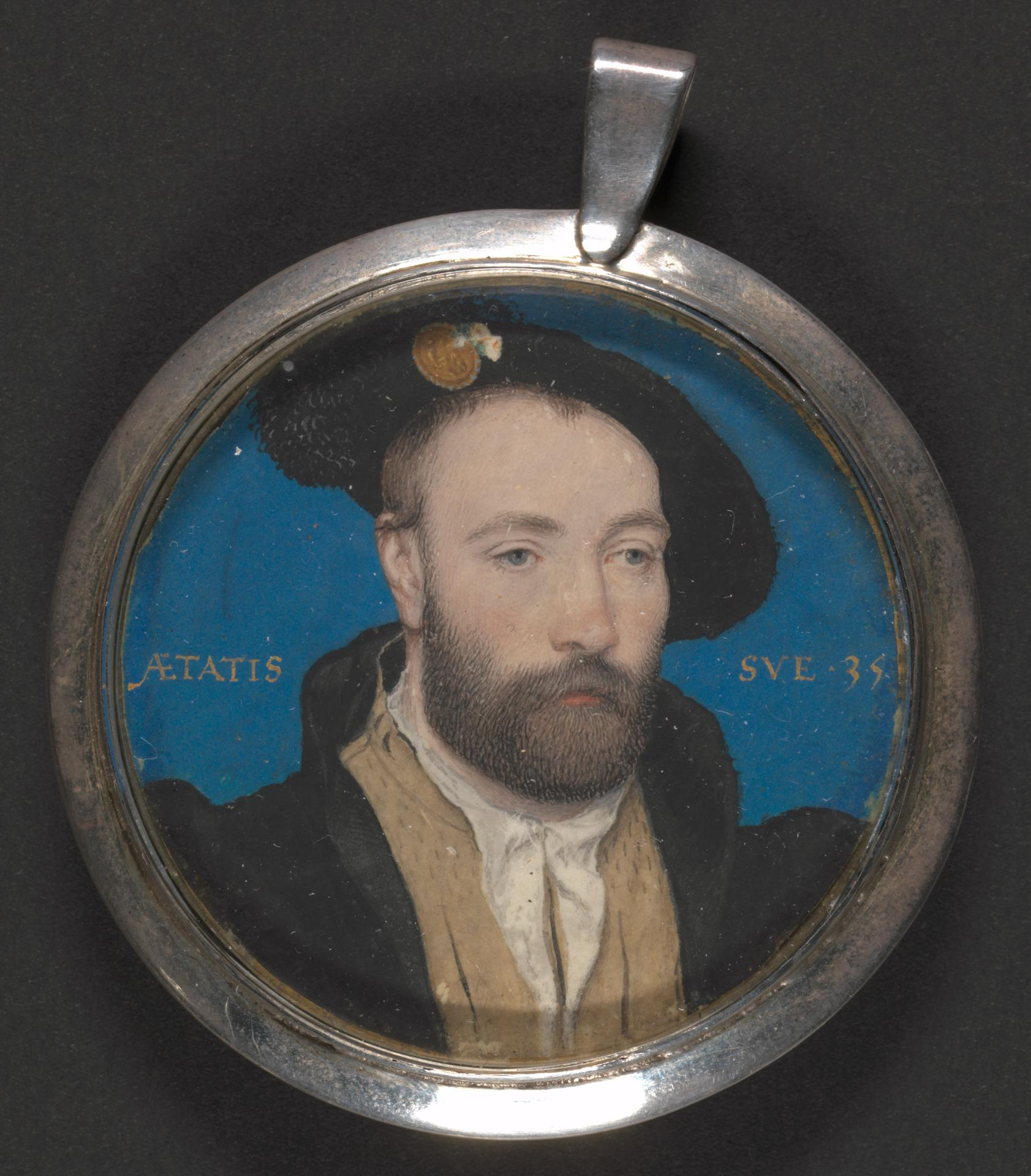
Portrait of a man, probably Sir George Carew, c. 1540

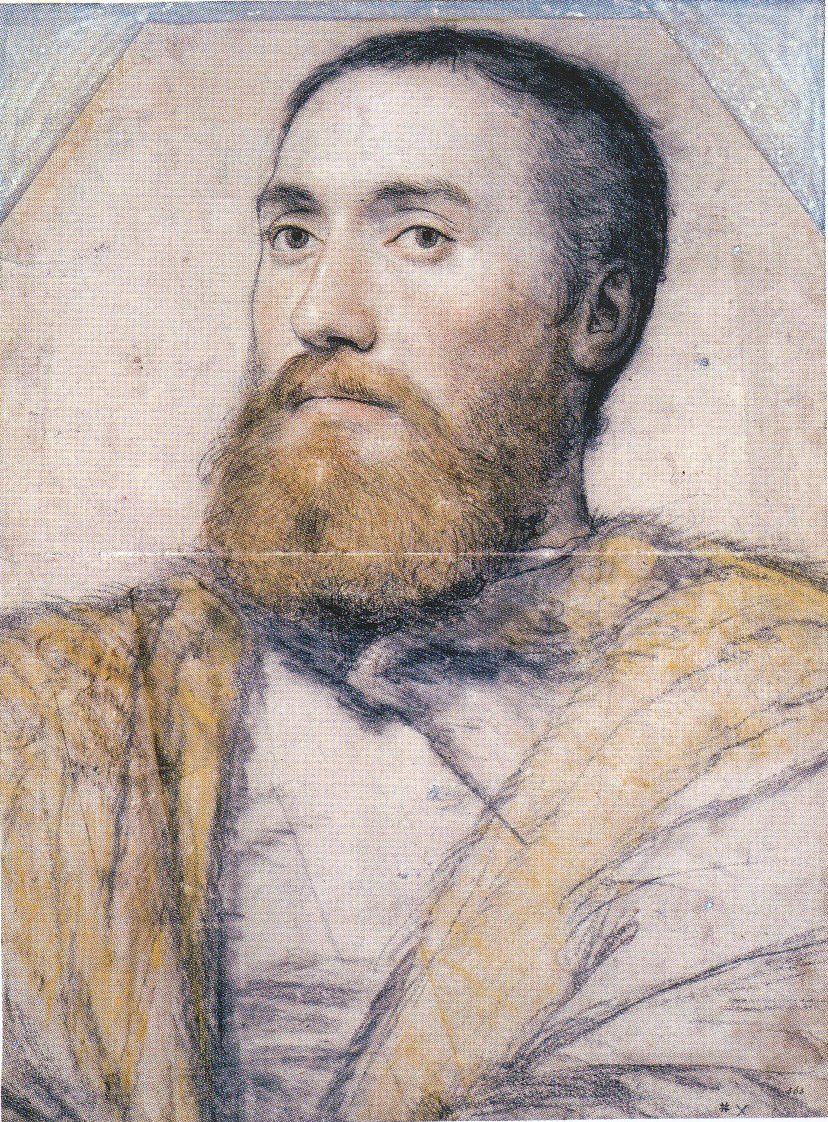
Portrait of an Unknown Man, possibly identifiable as Thomas Seymour, c. 1535–1540

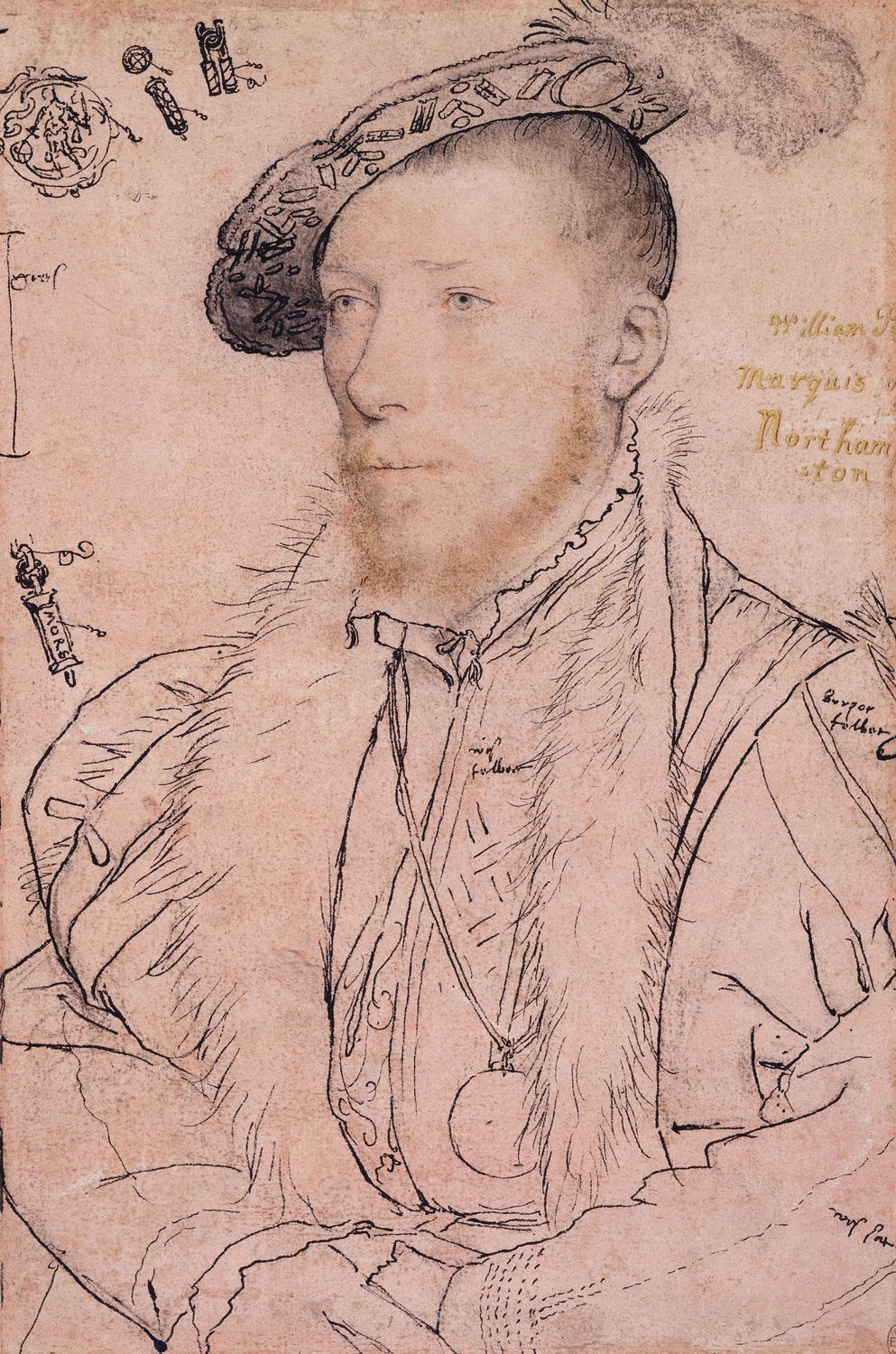
William Parr, later Marquess of Northampton, c. 1538–1542

In 1913 German art historian Georg Habich discovered another portrait miniature of an unknown young man by Hans Holbein the Younger in the Danzig Stadtmuseum. The miniature was first recorded in the museum's collection in 1902. There was a tradition in Danzig that the subject was a member of the Schwarzwald family. In 1708, after the male line of the Schwarzwald family had died out, the portrait, together with a library and a coin collection, formed part of a legacy left to the church of Saints Peter and Paul in Danzig. The inscription — ANNO ETATIS // SVÆ 24 1543 — indicates that the sitter was twenty-four in 1543 and consequently born circa 1519. The sitter has hooded eyes and a turned up nose; his clothing is English, with a pointed tasselled collar as seen in English portraits of the period, for example, Portrait of a man, probably Sir George Carew (c.1540). The portrait was looted from the Danzig Stadtmuseum by the German occupation forces in 1943, then claimed by the Soviet Union's Red Army as spoils of war in 1945. The portrait, now held at the Pushkin State Museum of Fine Arts in Moscow, is one of a number of works of art subject to restitution requests by the Polish government.

Habich identified the sitter as the merchant, Heinrich von Schwarzwald (8 July 1517−1561), the eldest son of Hans I (Johann) von Schwarzwald (1468–1521) by his third wife, Margarethe von Reesen, but Heinrich's age does not match the inscription, nor does the "Z or very widely placed N" on the signet ring correspond to his merchant's mark or the Schwarzwald coat of arms. None of the Steelyard merchants who were painted by Holbein have a merchant's mark on a signet ring, only a coat of arms: for example, The Merchant George Gisze (1497-1562) (on the table) and Hermann von Wedigh III (died 1560) (on his index finger).

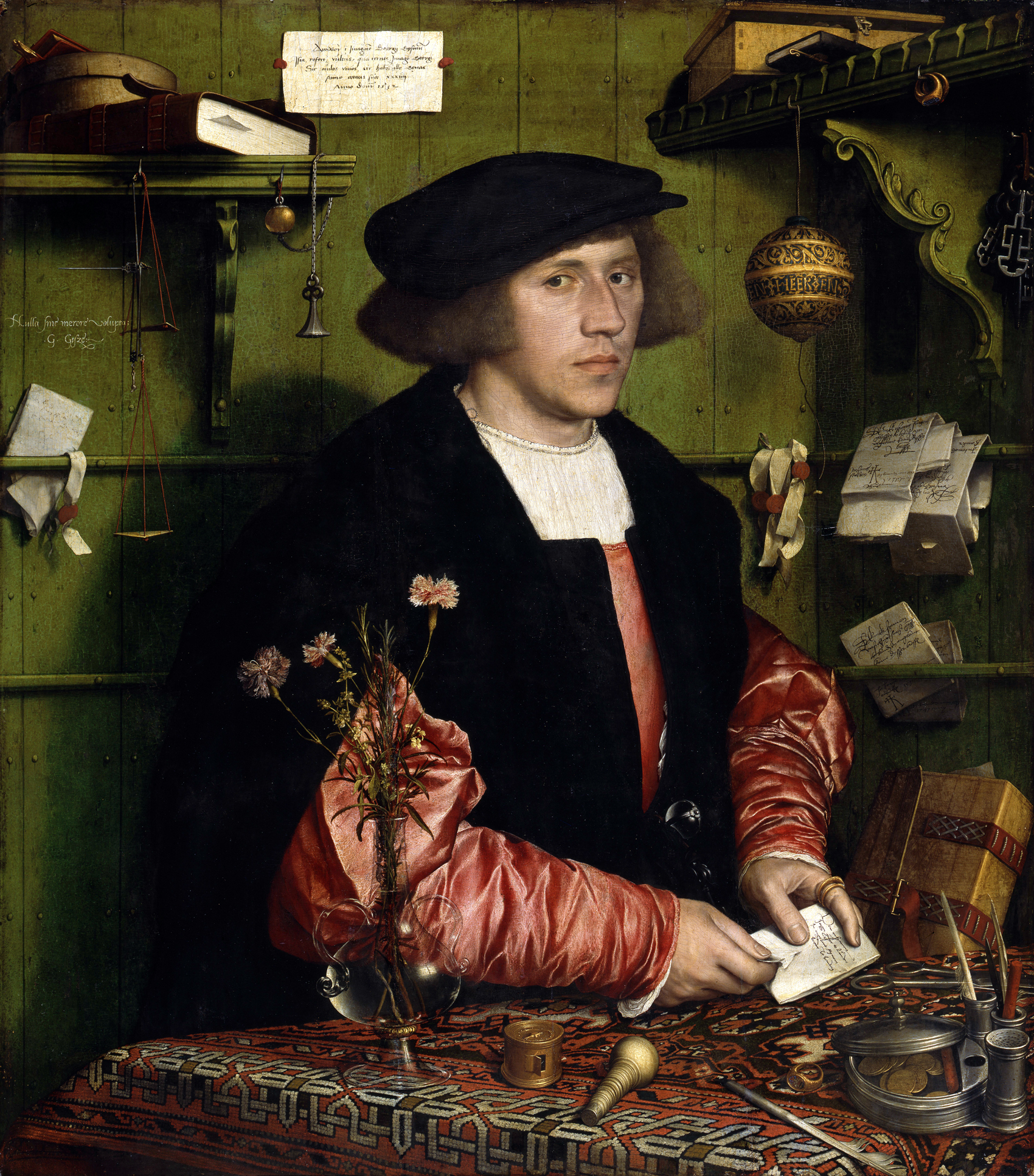
The merchant George Gisze (1497-1562), 1532

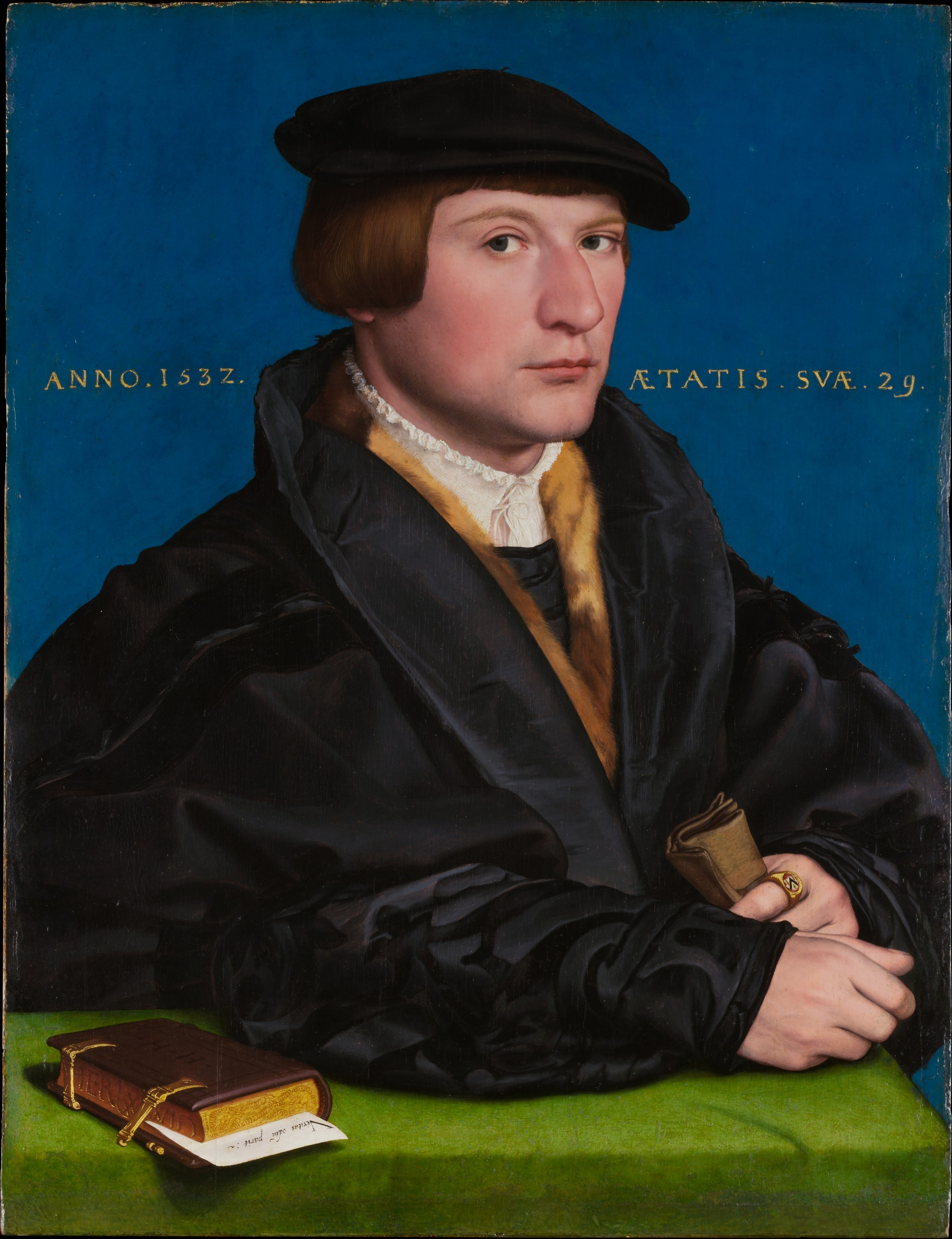
Hermann von Wedigh III (died 1560), 1532

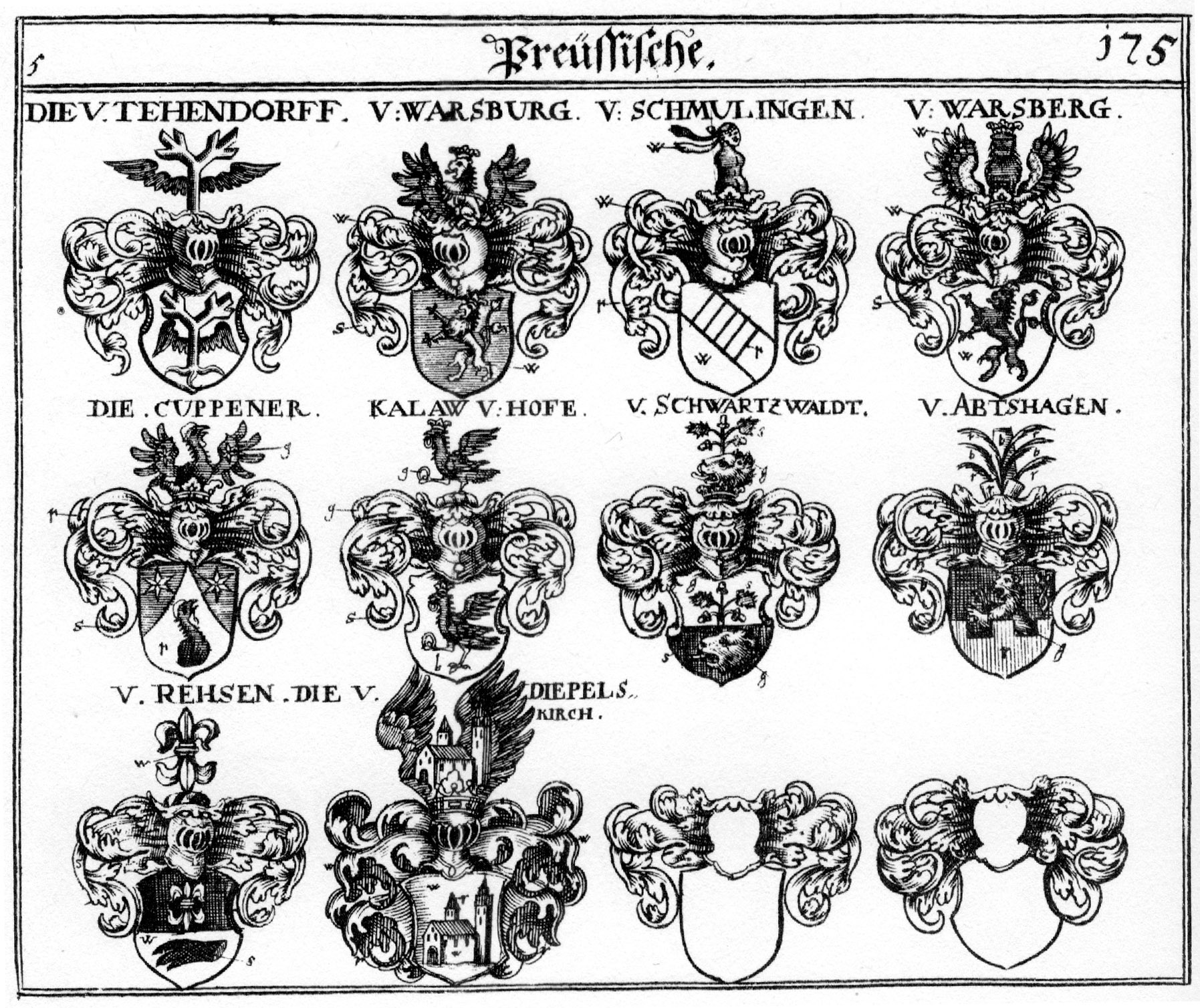
Siebmacher's Wappenbuch bd. 5., S. 175

Hans Secker, the Director of the Danzig Stadmuseum, claimed that by tradition the sitter was known as Hans II (Johann) von Schwarzwald (13 June 1513−1575), the eldest son of Hans I (Johann) von Schwarzwald (1468–1521) by his second wife, Margarethe Cölmer, but Heinrich's older half-brother, who was born in 1513, is around six years older than the subject of the painting. Heinrich's younger brother, Berend, who reached the age of 24 only on 21 September in 1543, shortly before Holbein's death and during an outbreak of plague, is unlikely to be the sitter. In 1543 there was a "great death" in London, which lasted so far into the winter that the Michaelmas law term had to be kept at St. Albans. Another civic chronicle adds that there had been a great death in the summer before; and from an ordinance of the Privy Council it appears that the plague was in London as early as 21 May 1543. Hans Holbein died between 7 October, when he made his will at his home in Aldgate, and 29 November 1543, when John of Antwerp carried out the artist's last wishes.

The year 1543 is significant for two reasons: Henry VIII married his sixth wife, Catherine Parr and the "King's painter", Hans Holbein died. The portrait miniature of the 24-year-old man has a special significance in that it may have been the artist's last work.

In 2003 Quentin Buvelot noted that "On the basis of the similarity of facial features and in particular the characteristic angle of the cropped hair, it could even be conjectured that the two portraits depict the same person." In the same year the sitter was identified as Hans II Schwarzwaldt (1513–1575), the son of merchant Hans I Schwarzwald (1468–1521), based on a very strong resemblance to the subject of the other portrait miniature painted by Holbein in 1543 and since only he was at that time in the Steelyard in London. Hans II (Johann), however, was 30 years of age in 1543, not 24.

According to Roy Strong the existence of a second miniature indicates a sitter of exceptional importance: royal personages and near-relations. In 2016 Teri Fitzgerald and Diarmaid MacCulloch suggested that the sitter might be Henry VIII's brother-in-law, Gregory Cromwell (c.1520–1551), son of the king's chief minister, Thomas Cromwell. Gregory Cromwell married, in 1537, Elizabeth Seymour, the widow of Sir Anthony Ughtred (d. 1534) and a younger sister of Queen Jane Seymour, Henry VIII's third wife. The subsequent birth of a prince also meant he was an uncle to the future Edward VI. Gregory, who was born in or before 1520, was the right age and of suitable status to be the subject of the portraits. There is every likelihood that a miniature of Thomas's son Gregory would have been painted around the time of his marriage, "when both father and son had so much to celebrate." It is of interest to note that, in Cromwell's accounts for 1538, there is a payment on 4 January to "Hanns the painter, 40s."

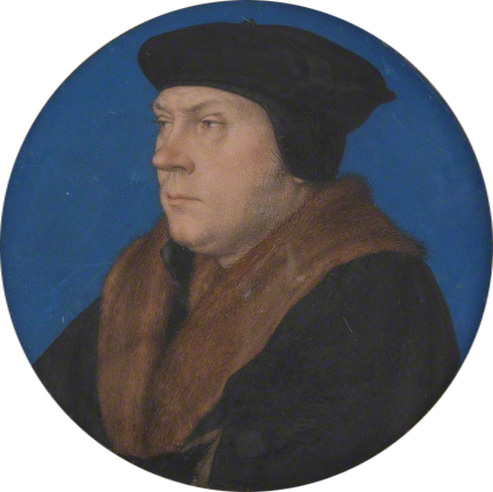
Thomas Cromwell, Earl of Essex, c. 1532–1533

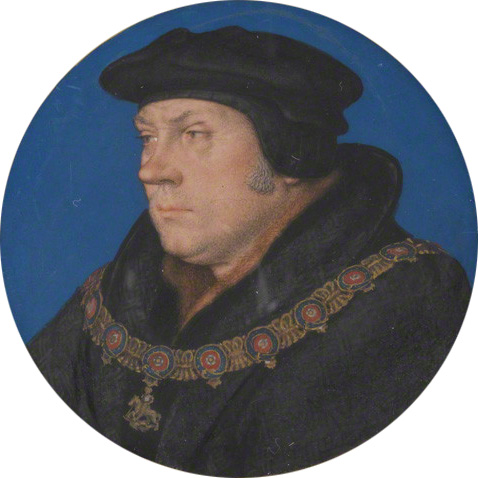
Thomas Cromwell, Earl of Essex, c. 1537

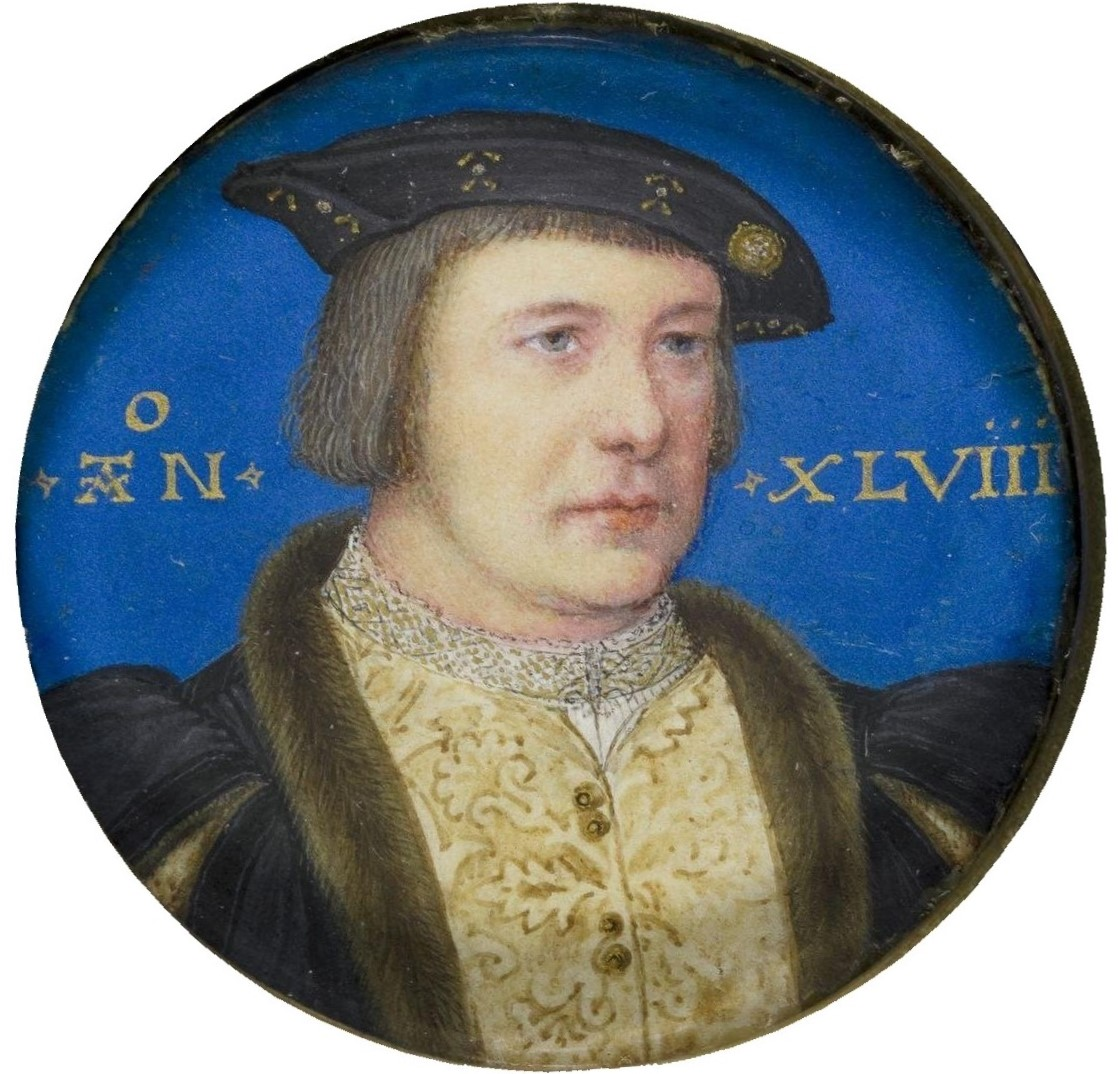
Portrait miniature of a gentleman, possibly Charles Brandon, Duke of Suffolk, c. 1532

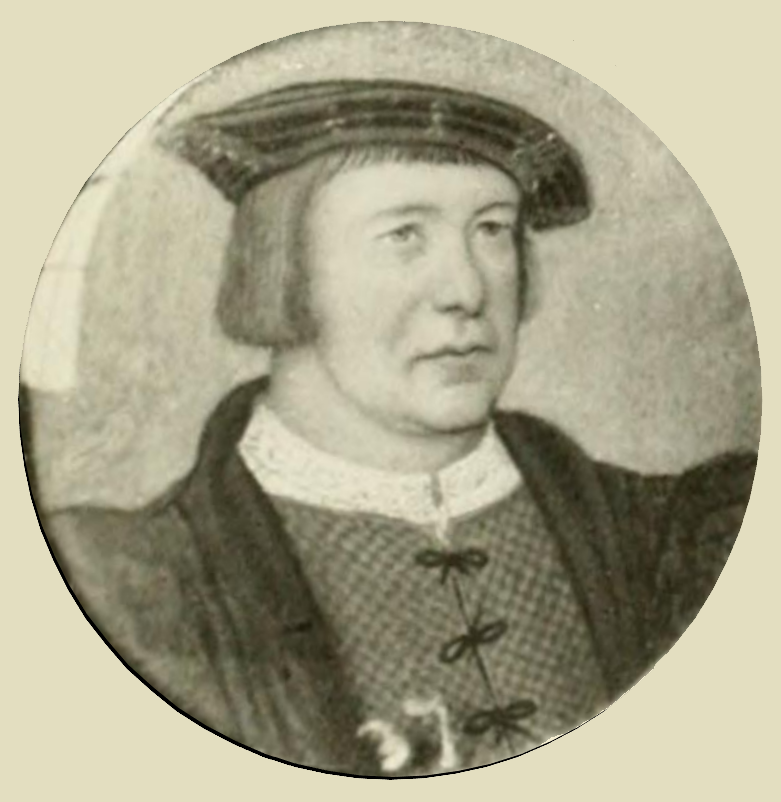
Portrait miniature of a gentleman, possibly Charles Brandon, Duke of Suffolk, c. 1532

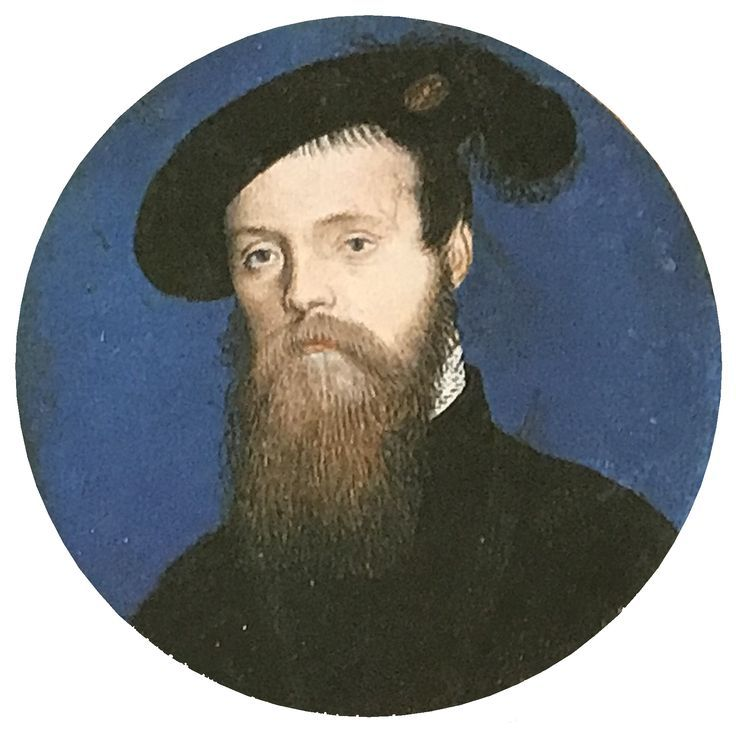
Thomas Seymour, Baron Seymour of Sudeley, c. 1540

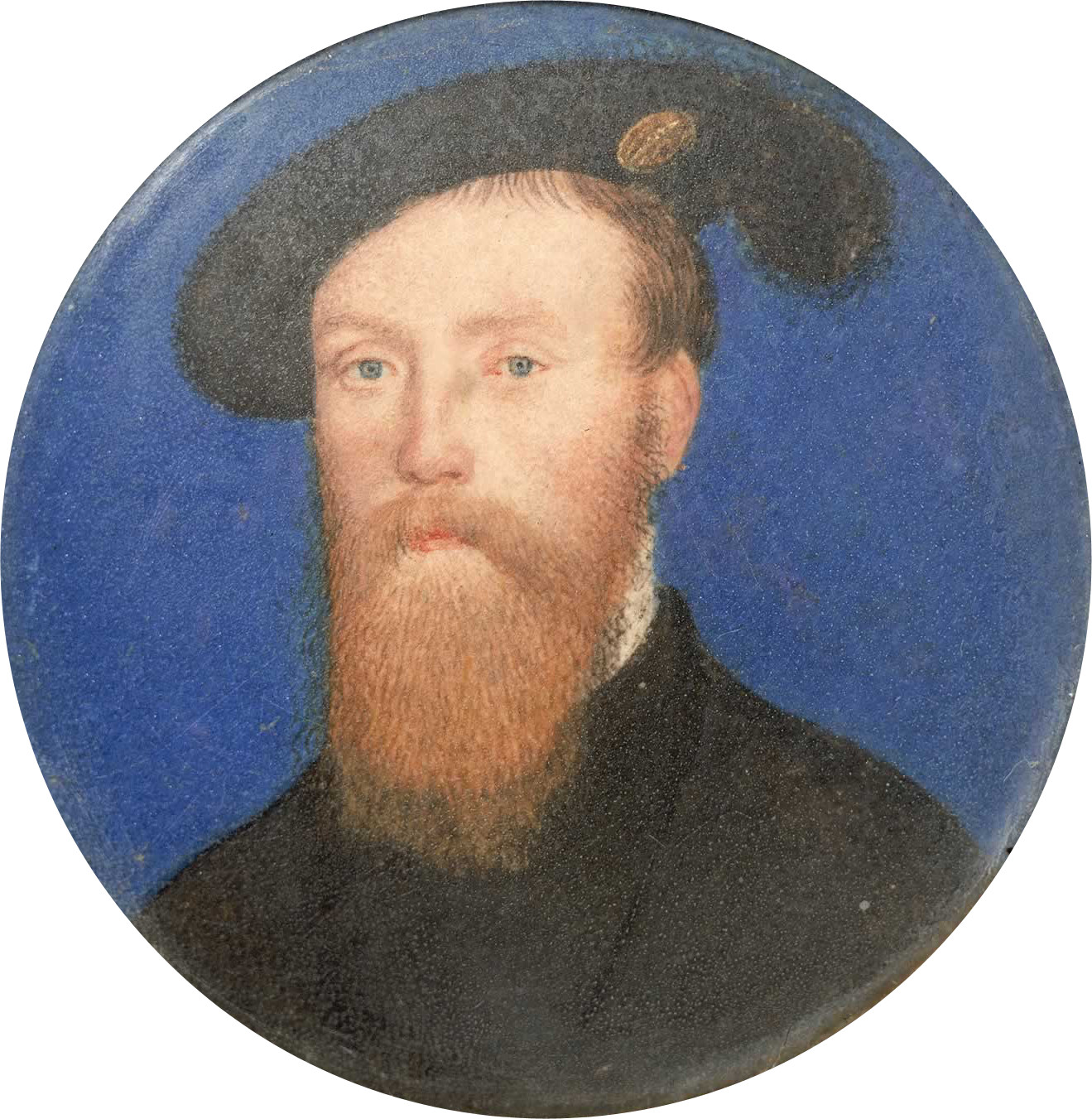
Thomas Seymour, Baron Seymour of Sudeley, c. 1545 –1547

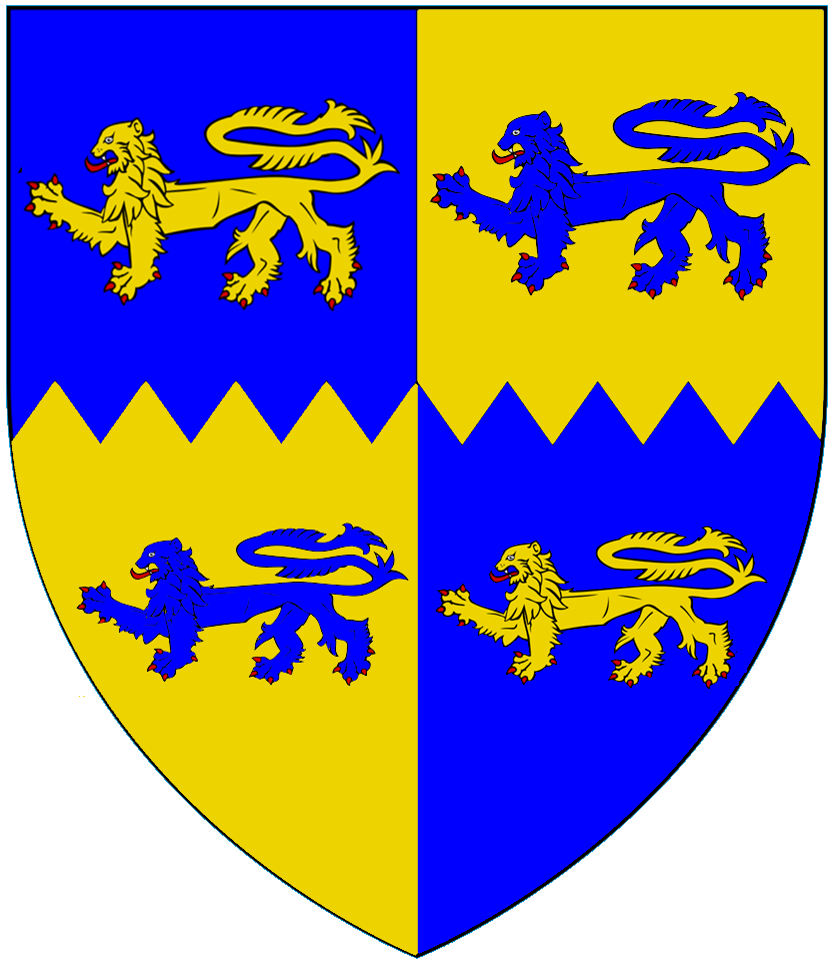
Coat of arms of Gregory Cromwell, 1st Baron Cromwell

The young man's features "have a distinct resemblance" to those of his father and he has the "same characteristic Cromwell upturned nose." The "Z or N detail on the signet ring" in the 1543 portrait can be accounted for by Gregory Cromwell's coat of arms, "if it is seen as a zig-zag, or in heraldic terms, a fess indented." Two portrait miniatures of Gregory's brother-in-law, Thomas Seymour, from the 1540s are extant:Thomas Seymour, Baron Seymour of Sudeley (c. 1545–1547) at the National Maritime Museum, London and Thomas Seymour, Baron Seymour of Sudeley, (c. 1540), attributed to Lucas Horenbout in the Royal Collections, The Hague.

== Provenance ==
Probably the merchant and collector, Heinrich IV Schwarzwald (1619–1672); by descent to his nephew, Heinrich V Schwarzwald (1642–1705); with a library and coin collection, part of a legacy left to the Lutheran Church of Saints Peter and Paul, Danzig by the Schwarzwald family in 1708; Danzig Stadtmuseum by 1902; looted from the Danzig Stadtmuseum by the German occupation forces in 1943; claimed by the Soviet Union's Red Army as spoils of war and taken to Moscow in 1945; Pushkin State Museum of Fine Arts, Moscow.

== See also ==
- Artists of the Tudor court
- List of paintings by Hans Holbein the Younger
