= Bartholomeus von Schachman =

German politician, mayor and art collector

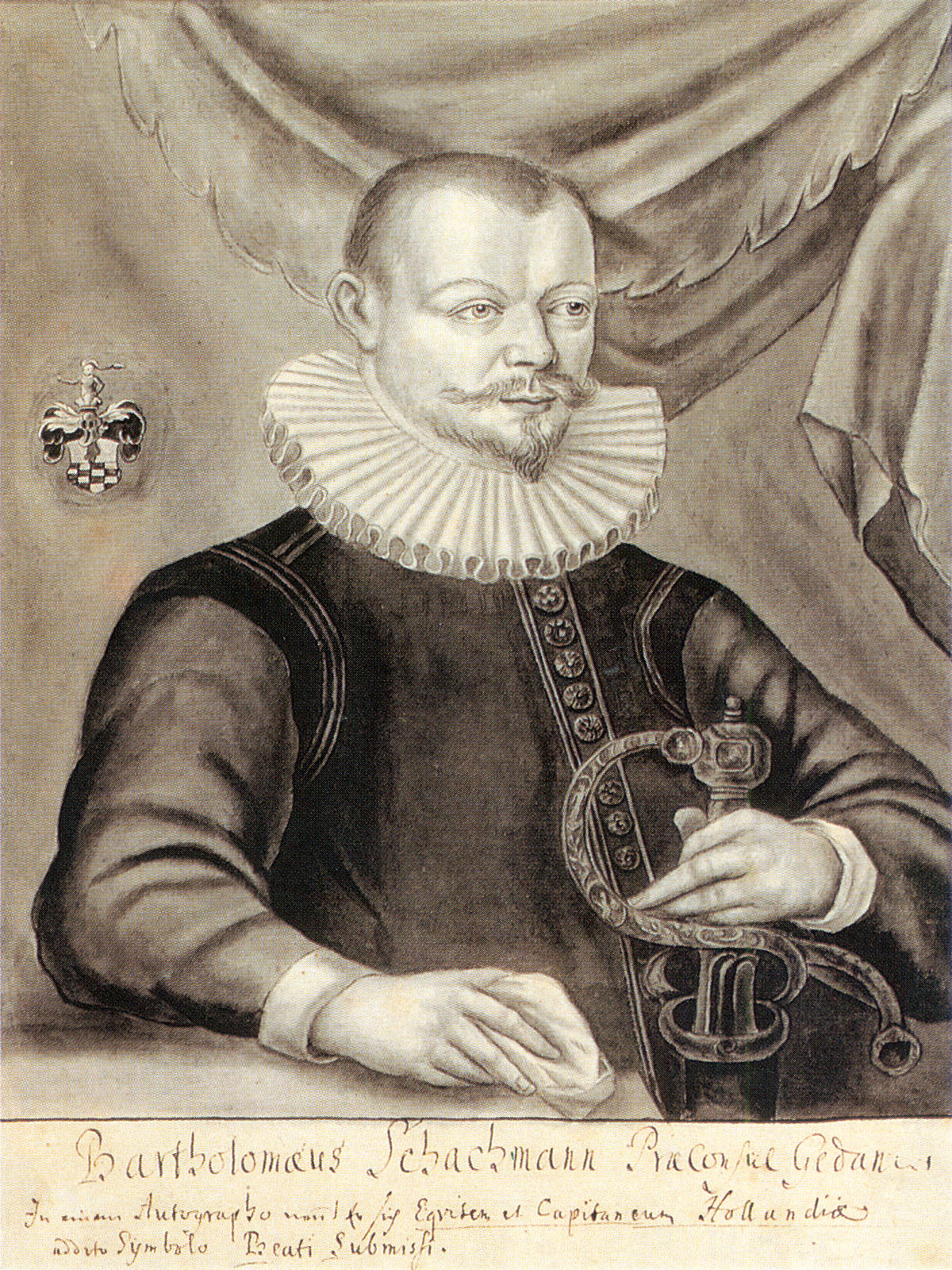
- Bartholomäus Schachmann, 1605, by Anton Möller
- Born: 11 September 1559; Gdańsk
- Died: 23 April 1614 (aged 54)
- Resting place: St. Mary's Church, Gdańsk; 54.34975°N 18.653694°E
- Other name: Bartholomäus Schachmann
- Education: Kraków Academy
- Occupations: Politician; explorer; art collector
- Office: Mayor of Gdańsk
- Term: 1605
- Spouses: Catharina Schwartzwaldt (m. 1592; died 1599) Anna Blömken (m. 1600)
- Children: with Anna: Bartholomeus von Schachman; Sophie von Schachman; Barbara von Schachman; Anna von Schachman
- Parents: Caspar Schachman (father); Elisabeth Brandt (mother)

Bartholomeus von Schachman (11 September 1559 – 23 April 1614), also known as Bartholomäus Schachmann, was a German explorer, art collector and mayor of Danzig.

== Early life ==
He was born on the 11th of September 1559 in Danzig (today called Gdańsk), to Caspar Schachman and Elisabeth Brandt. Bartholomeus belonged to one of the most renowned Danzig families. His father, Caspar Schachman (1520–1573), was the councillor of the Right Main City, the chief authority in Danzig. His mother, Elisabeth Brandt (1526–1577), was the daughter of Danzig's mayor Bartholomeus Brandt. Bartholomeus Schachman received an excellent education for that time. In 1579–80, together with his younger brother Jan, he studied at the Krakow Academy, continuing his education in 1581 at the academy in Danzig. From 1582 Schachman continued with his education, spending some time in educational centres in Strasbourg, from January 1582, Basel in 1586 to 1587, and Siena in August 1588.

== Album Amicorum ==
We know of Schachman's university years because of the book Album Amicorum. The earliest entries are dated April to May 1580, then Strasbourg from January to February 1582, and the last ones in 1585. The Album Amicorum contains entries made by the owner's friends, relatives and acquaintances. On the first page of the book is an inscription, made by János Zsámboky. The inscription described Schachman as a young, friendly and caring man. The earliest entries in this book take us to Kraków, where, according to the entries themselves, Schachman was in Kraków from April to October 1580. On the opposite page is the blazon of the Tricesius family, finely drawn in pen-and-ink. Besides Tricesius, the following have inscribed their names: The astrologer and mathematician of the Kraków University Petrus Slovacius, and Klemens Crupius of Wieliczka, professor at Kraków university, as well as doctor Anton Schneeberger. Bartholomeus fellow students from Kraków also made entries, for example, Stanislaus Hesse of Wrocław, and Johann Speiman, whom later in life, like Schachman, became a juror in his hometown. The next entries, dated January to October 1582, are written when Bartholomeus was in Strasbourg in Alsace. Inscriptions were made by the professor of philosophy Melchior Junius, Laurentius Tuppius, Obertus Giphanius, and Georg Obrecht, as well as the physician Melchior Sebicius. The rest of the pages contain numerous inscriptions and entries made by Schachman's other friends, fellow students and dining partners. Some notable entries were made by Johann Sten of Denmark, Schachman's school friend, Holger Ulffstand, also from Denmark, and Schachman's school friend, Melchior Ulffstand, Thomas Wilhelmus and Henricus Giese. Henricus Giese belonged to a renowned patrician family from Danzig. He was the son of the councillor Albrecht Giese and Barbara Niederhoff. In addition to the written entries and images of coats of arms, the Amicorum is decorated with six illustrations of Strasbourg citizens in colourful costumes. It is unlikely that these illustrations were made from observation. They were most likely copied from the Strasbourg costume books that were very popular at the time.

== Travel ==
Five years separate the last entry by Bartholomeus Schachman in the Amicorum and the date of his travel album in the Orientalist Museum collection. Schachman continued his education through travel, as mentioned in the old handwritten Danzig genealogies: “Barthel Schachman, born Ao 1559, 11 Sept, has travelled far in three parts of the World ...”. His journey through the Ottoman Empire, together with his brother, lasted two years, from 1588 to 1589, and his album, conveying the tale of his adventures, became one of the greatest sixteenth-century travelogues. The paintings inside the album paint a detailed account of Bartholomeus travel. There are no detailed records of Schachman's travel route and the dates of his arrivals to the different cities along the way. The only known date is that of his presence in the capital of the Ottoman Empire, which we know from the diary of a traveller named Samuel Kiechel, who met Schachman and his brother Jan on 7 November 1588 in the house of the ambassador of the Holy Roman Empire. The Schachman brothers were travelling in a large group of dignitaries, and, according to Kiechel, had just arrived in Istanbul from Venice and were headed towards Tripoli in present-day Lebanon. He also traveled through Germany, France, Italy as well as Egypt. He collected art and souvenirs from the countries he visited. Though after his death, his collection became scattered, and no record of what it contained remains.

== Later life ==
After his travels, Bartholomeus settled down in Danzig. In 1592, on the 11th of February he married Catharina Schwartzwaldt, the widow of Michel Kerls. Schachman's political career progressed in 1594. He became a city councillor – and his status culminated in 1605, when he was elected as the city mayor. After the death of his wife Catharina on the 28th of February 1599, Bartholomeus married again, in 1600, on the 9th of October. He married Anna Blömken, and the couple had six children, though only four lived to adulthood. Bartholomeus supervised the rebuilding of the Great Council Hall and the building of the Great Armory.

== Death ==
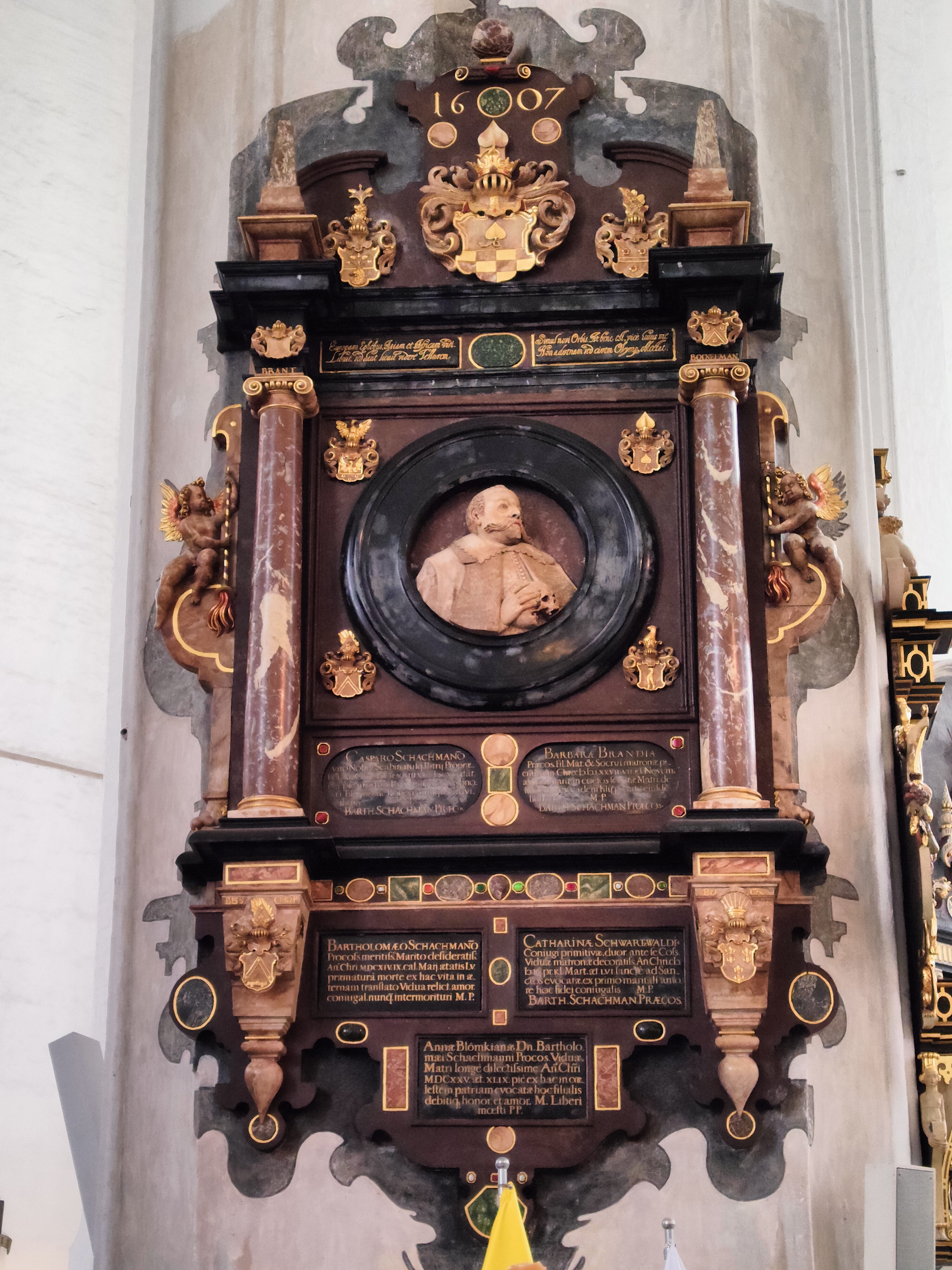
Epitaph on Bartholomeus von Schachman, St. Mary's Church, Gdańsk

Bartholomeus died on the 23rd of April in 1614. He was buried in the church of St Mary in Danzig. He commissioned an epitaph in 1607 from the sculptor Abraham van der Blocke, to memorate himself, his parents and his two wives.

== Family ==
He was married twice, first to Catharina Schwartzwaldt, then to Anna Blömken. He had six children with his second wife, but only four survived to adulthood. His only surviving son, Bartholomeus, named after his father, married in 1645, but died without offspring in 1661. His daughters Sophie, Barbara and Anna married. Barbara married twice, but died at only 25 years old, in 1634. Sophie married Philip Furtenbach, and she died in 1669. Anna married Jacob Schelle, and the couple had eleven children.
