= Georg Habich =

German numismatist and art historian

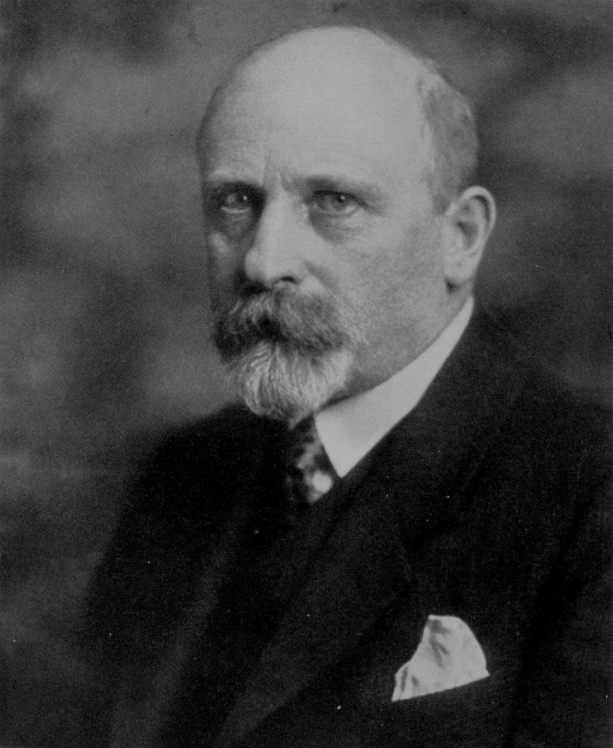
- Georg Habich (1868-1932)
- Born: 24 June 1868; Darmstadt
- Died: 6 December 1932 (aged 64); Munich
- Education: Ludwig-Georgs-Gymnasium Darmstadt; University of Bonn; Ludwig-Maximilians-Universität München (DPhil)
- Occupations: Numismatist; art historian
- Notable work: Die deutschen Medailleure des XVI. Jahrhunderts
- Office: Director of the Bavarian State Coin Collection (Staatliche Münzsammlung München)
- Term: 1907–1932
- Predecessor: Hans Riggauer
- Successor: Max Bernhart
- Parents: Johann Georg Habich (father); Susanna Clara Emma Bücking (mother)
- Relatives: Ludwig Habich (brother)

Georg Habich (24 June 1868 in Darmstadt – 6 December 1932 in Munich) was a German numismatist and art historian. He was the Director of the Bavarian State Coin Collection (Staatliche Münzsammlung München) from 1907 to 1932.

== Life ==
He was born on 24 June 1868 in Darmstadt to innkeeper and wine merchant, Johann Georg Habich (1842–1881) and Susanna Clara Emma Bücking (1844–1922). His younger brother was the sculptor, Ludwig Habich (1872–1949).

After attending Ludwig-Georgs-Gymnasium in Darmstadt, Habich studied philology, classical archaeology, and art history at the University of Bonn and the Ludwig-Maximilians-Universität München. During his studies, he became a member of the Bonn Philological Society, part of the Naumburg Cartel Association of German Scientists. After receiving his doctorate (DPhil) under Heinrich Brunn in 1894 with the dissertation, Die Amazonengruppe des Attalischen Weihgeschenks, he became an assistant at the then Royal Coin Cabinet in Munich. His treatise was published in 1896, two years after the formal conferral of his doctorate, which took place on 25 July 1894, two days after the death of Heinrich Brunn, according to the custom of a public scholarly address followed by a defence of his theses.

In 1902 Habich published a study on the Barberini Faun, which followed the earlier publication of several smaller (archaeological) works.

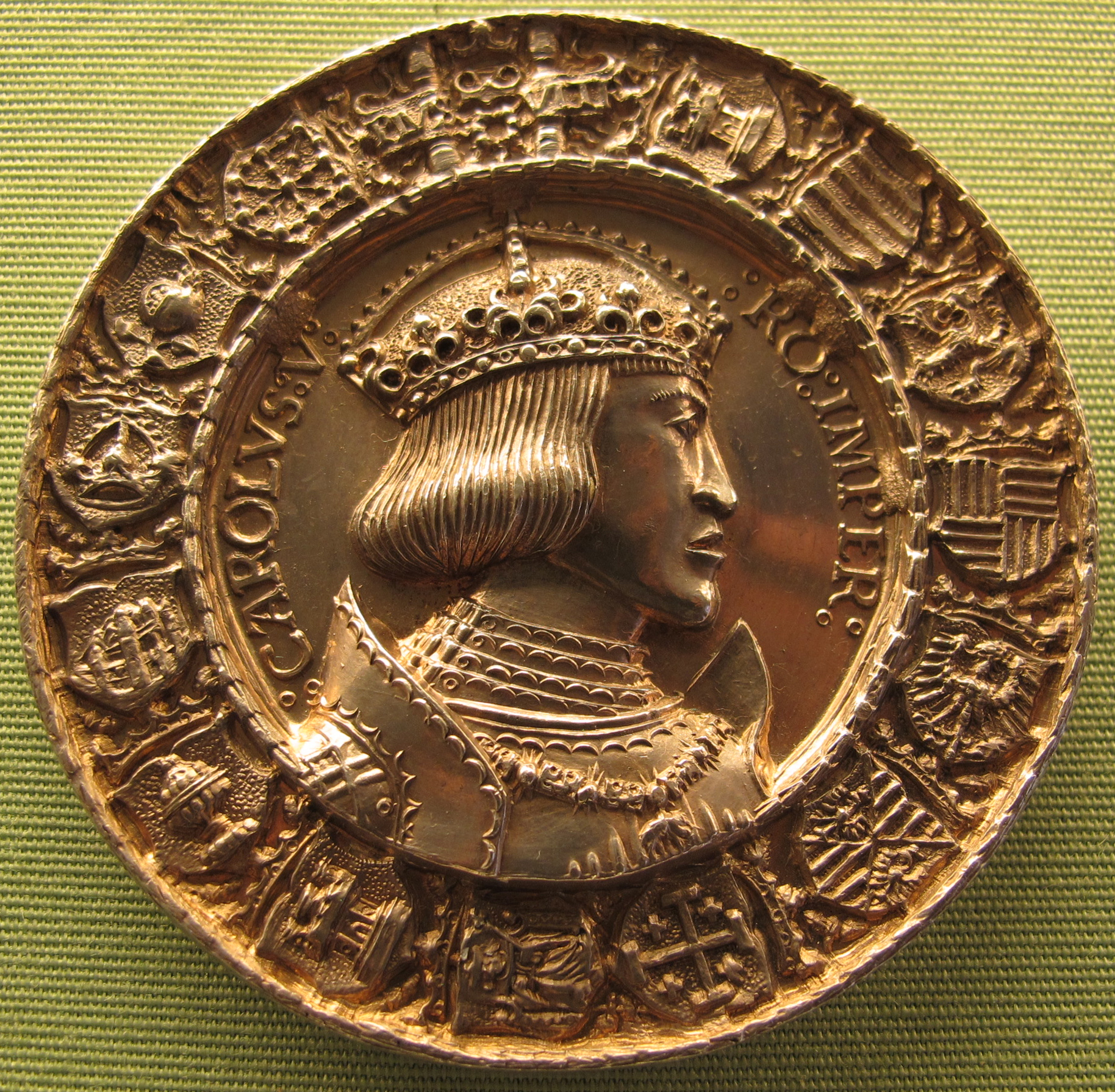
Albrecht Dürer and Hans Krafft, Charles V, 1520–1521. Staatliche Münzsammlung München

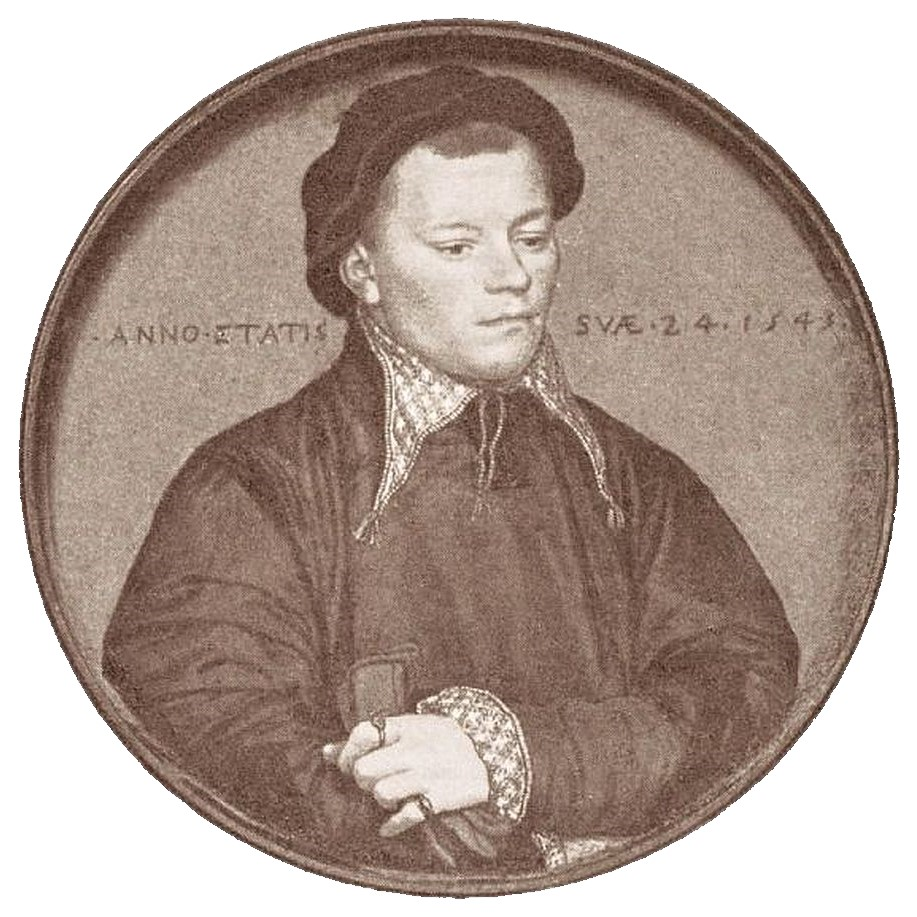
Portrait of a Man Aged 24, 1543 called Portrait of Johann von Schwarzwaldt, by Hans Holbein the Younger

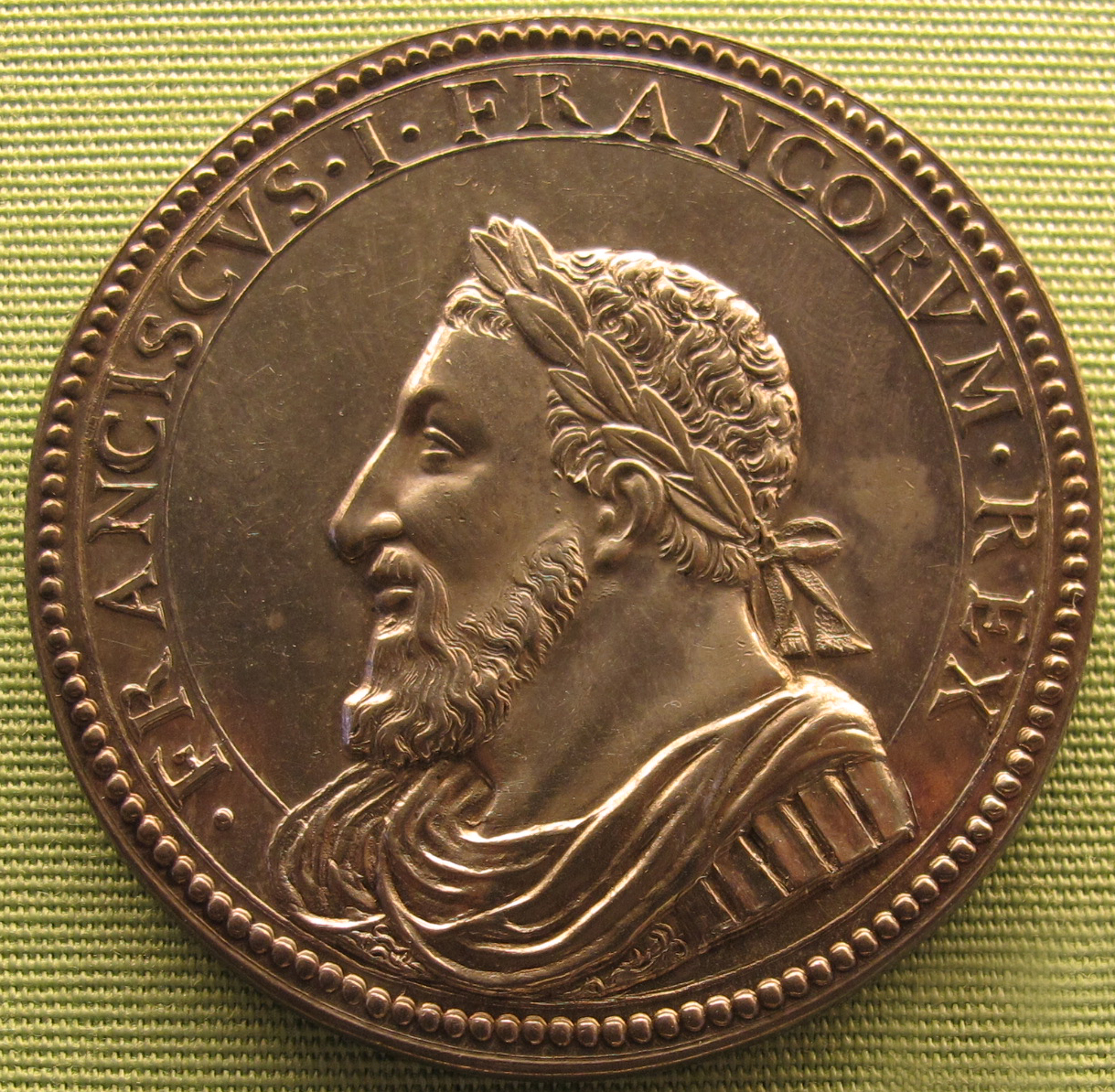
Unidentified medallist, Francis I, 1515/1522. Staatliche Münzsammlung München

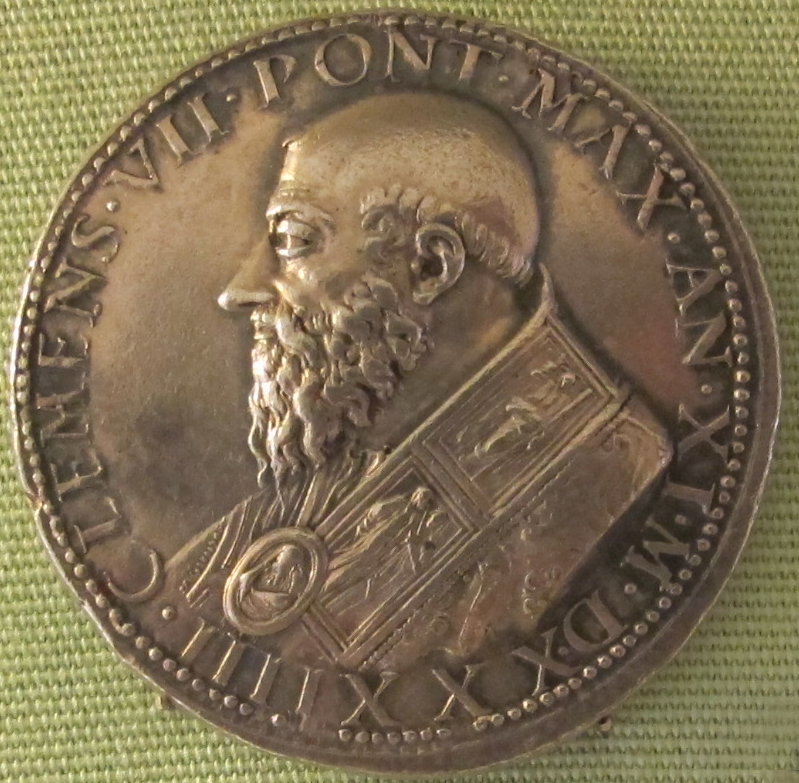
Benvenuto Cellini, Pope Clement VII, 1534. Staatliche Münzsammlung München

After the death of Hans Riggauer in 1907, he became the Director of the Coin Collection. During Habich's tenure, the collection was expanded primarily through Renaissance medals and plaques. Although numismatics played a significant role in his career, ″it did not diminish his love for the art of antiquity and the Renaissance.″

In 1909 he began the publication in the Jahrbuch der Königlich Preussischen Kunstsammlungen of Berlin of his articles on the German Renaissance Medal, in which he dealt with an ″enormously comprehensive collection of material, both in actual medals and models, and in documents.″ From 1910, Habich was an associate member and, from 1920, a full member of the Bavarian Academy of Sciences.

From 1912 onward, he held the position of honorary professor of numismatics and medal studies at the university.

In 1913 Habich published his findings on a portrait miniature of an unidentified young man, which he attributed to Hans Holbein the Younger, in the Danzig Stadtmuseum. In the same year he was involved in a dispute with a rival claimant for the discovery: Hans Secker, Director of the Danzig Stadtmuseum (now the National Museum, Gdańsk).

As director of the coin cabinet, he significantly expanded its holdings in all areas, paying particular attention to developing the medal department, so that the cabinet became one of the foremost collections in this field. He founded the Archiv für Medaillen- und Plakettenkunde (1913–26), a publication intended primarily to address unresolved issues; he supported contemporary medallists, especially those from Munich, with whom he had a personal connection.

In the Münzkabinett Berlin there is a medal that was made for Georg Habich by the sculptor and medallist, Josef Bernhart, in 1931. On the obverse is a bust portrait of Habich, with a Latin inscription: GEORGIVS HABICH PHIL DOCTOR AETAT SVAE ANN LXIII.

Habich died in Munich on 6 December 1532. He was succeeded as Director of the Coin Collection by Max Bernhart (1883–1952).

== Works ==
- Die deutschen Medailleure des XVI. Jahrhunderts, 1916.
- Die Medaillen der italienischen Renaissance. 1922.
- Die deutschen Schaumünzen des XVI. Jahrhunderts. 4 Bände, 1929–1934.
