= Hans Friedrich Secker =

German art historian and museum director

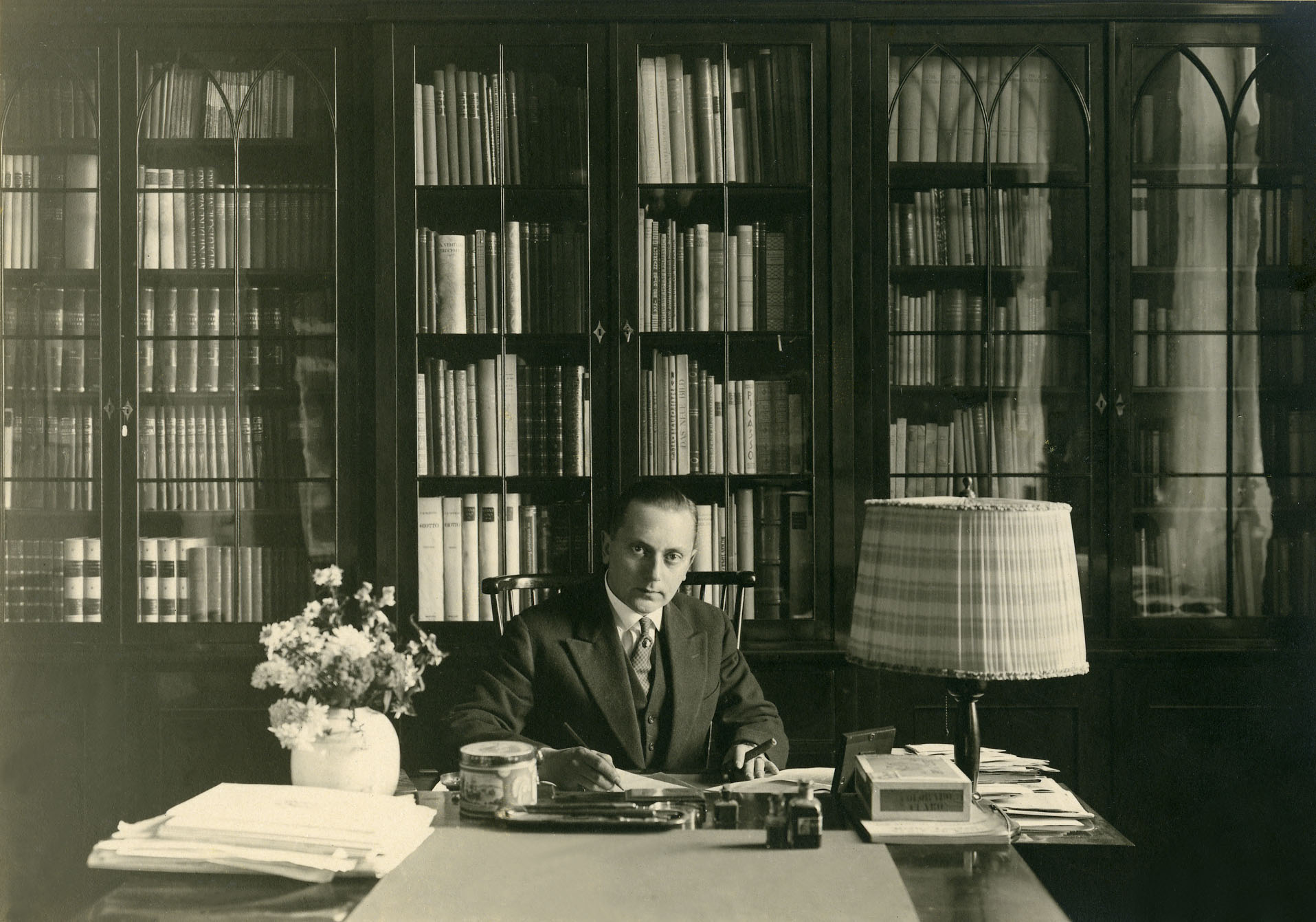
- H.F. Secker in his office at the Wallraf–Richartz Museum in the 1920s
- Born: 8 August 1888; Elberfeld, Rhineland, Germany
- Died: 7 August 1960 (aged 71); Pfronten, Bavaria
- Education: University of Halle; University of Berlin; University of Strasbourg (DPhil)
- Occupations: Art historian; museum director
- Title: Director of the Danzig Stadtmuseum (1912–1922); Director of the Wallraf–Richartz Museum (1922–1928)
- Spouses: Annie Elisabeth Wollstatt (m. 1921) Ilse von Mallinckrodt (m. 1929; died 1940) Gerda Schroeder (m. 1940)
- Father: Franz Ludwig Secker

Hans Friedrich Secker (8 April 1888 – 7 August 1960) was a German art historian and museum director. He was the Director of the Danzig Stadtmuseum from 1912 to 1922 and Director of the Wallraf–Richartz Museum in Cologne (with Karl Schäfer) from 1922 to 1928.

== Life ==
He was born on 8 April 1888 in Elberfeld, Rhineland (now a district of Wuppertal in western Germany). His father, Franz Ludwig Secker, was the director of the Institute of Scientific Education (Wissenschaftliches Lehrinstitut) in Elberfeld.

Secker attended the Gymnasium in Elberfeld and in Bad Münstereifel, where he passed his Abitur on 6 March 1906. He studied art history, Egyptology, and archaeology at the University of Halle, the University of Berlin, and the University of Strasbourg. On 17 December 1910, he received his doctorate (DPhil) in Strasbourg under Georg Dehio, and was subsequently employed as an assistant at the Hohenlohe-Museum in Strasbourg. In 1911 he was received into the Corps Palaio-Alsatia and became an assistant at the Kaiser-Friedrich Museum in Magdeburg.

=== Museum director in Danzig (1912–1922) ===
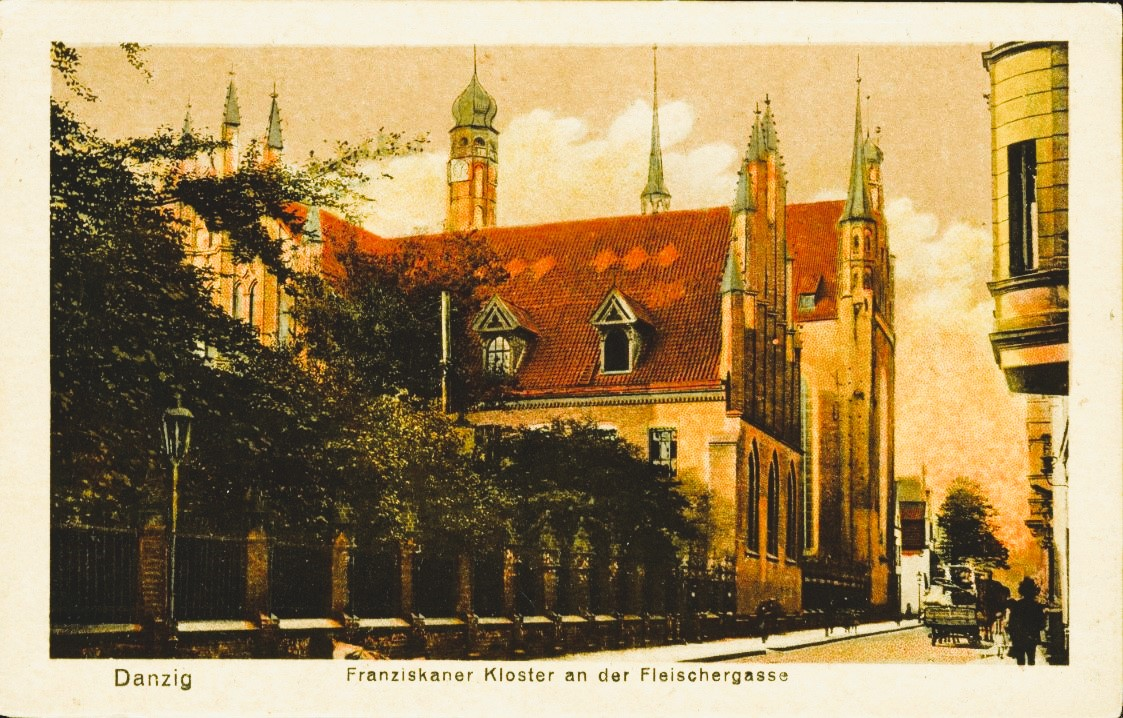
Danzig Stadmuseum, early 1900s

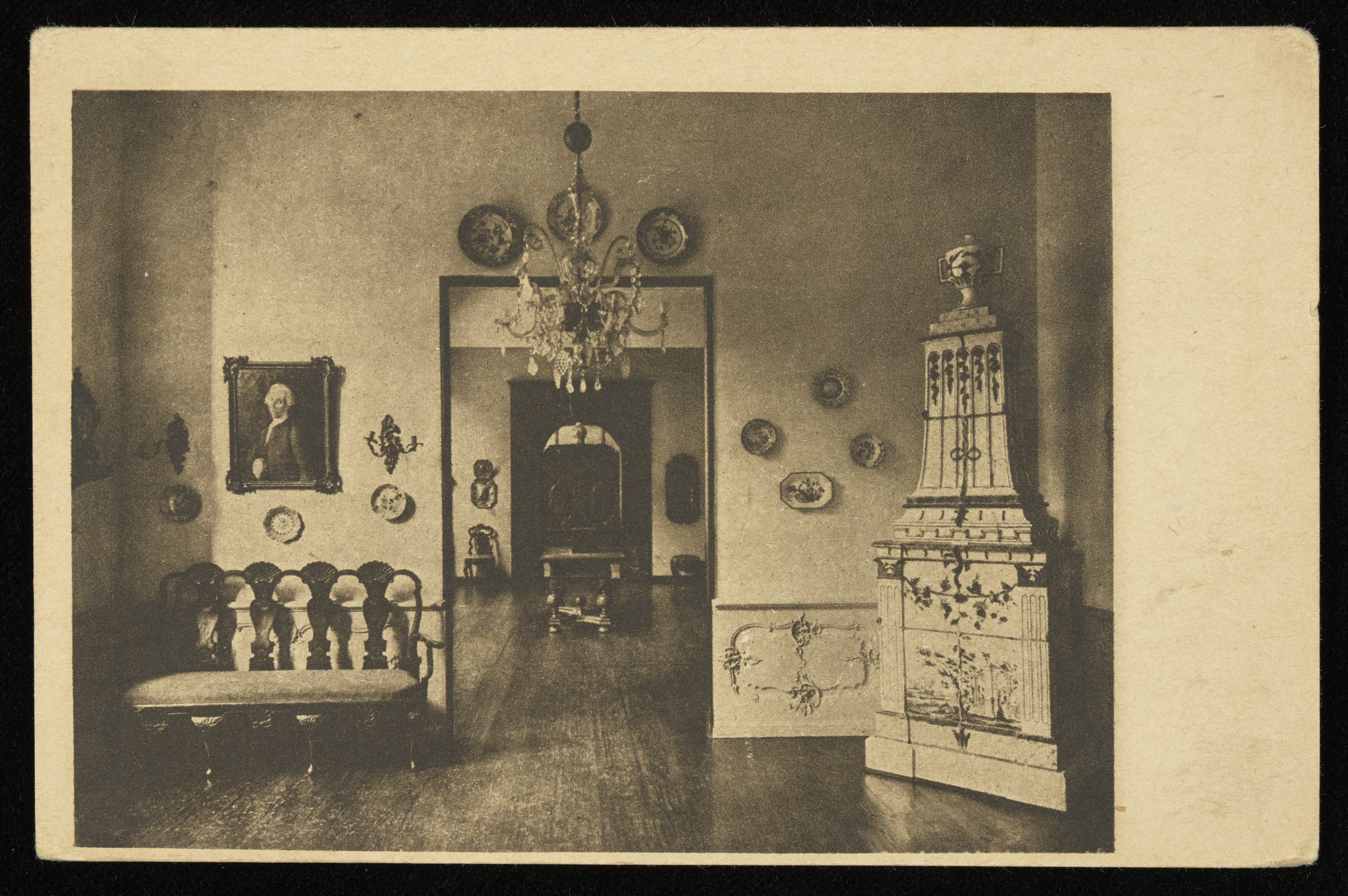
Danzig Stadtmuseum: Rococo Room, before 1918

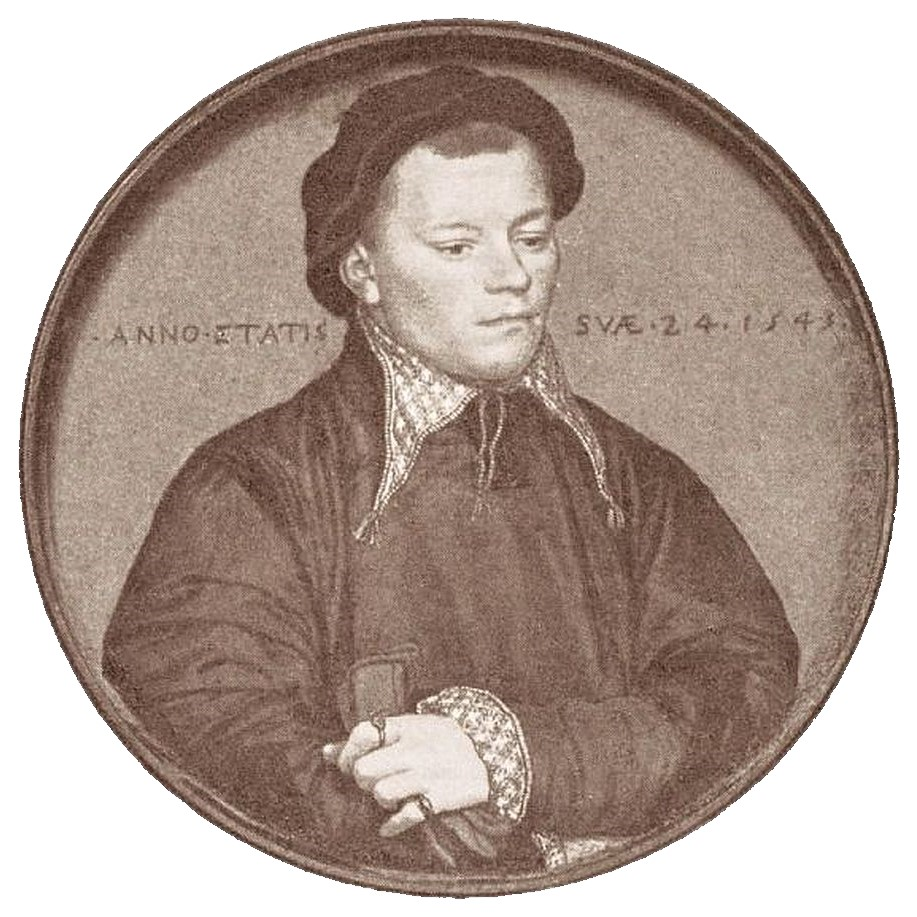
Portrait of a Man Aged 24, 1543 called Portrait of Johann von Schwarzwaldt, by Hans Holbein the Younger

From 1 September 1912 Secker was the Director of the Municipal Museum (Stadtmuseum) and the Provincial Museum of Decorative Arts in Danzig (now Gdańsk). He had impressed Theodor Volbehr, the founding director and head of the Magdeburg Museum, who recommended him to the Danzig city authorities with particular praise (in 1922, Volbehr recommended Secker to the then mayor of Cologne, Konrad Adenauer, as a ″charming, agile, and energetic person″).

Shortly before he arrived in Danzig, Secker visited the International Art Exhibition of the Sonderbund Westdeutscher Kunstfreunde und Künstler, which was held from 25 May to 30 September 1912, in Cologne. The 634 works in 29 halls offered the first comprehensive overview of modern art in Europe. Secker later remarked that the exhibition had filled him with a storm of excitement: ″There were building blocks for new cathedrals – what color and abundance, what a celebration!″

In Danzig, he learned that the ″rebellious forces″ of the avant-garde would not sweep the more sedate citizenry along, especially since the city council's ambitions were focused on a curator who would reorganize the disorganized collection of paintings and decorative arts, which were managed on a voluntary basis by a city councillor. These collections were stored in an abandoned 15th century Franciscan monastery. Secker, at 24 the youngest museum director in the German Reich, succeeded in bringing the processing of the collections to fruition within a few months. The grand opening of the art gallery in the skylit rooms of the building took place in May 1913. Secker's Führer durch die Öffentlichen Kunstsammlungen in Danzig (Guide to the Public Art Collections in Danzig) was published at the same time.

In the same year Secker was involved in a dispute with Georg Habich, Director of the then Royal Coin Collection (now Staatliche Münzsammlung München). Habich had published his findings on a portrait miniature of an unidentified young man, which he attributed to Hans Holbein the Younger, in the Danzig Stadtmuseum. Secker contested the priority of the attribution to Holbein.

A year later, the decorative arts collections of the Provincial Museum were displayed on the ground and middle floors, and the museum's own collection of artefacts from antiquity was exhibited in the cloisters of the monastery. Donations and endowments from Danzig citizens enabled a rapid expansion of the collections. Within a year, visitor numbers tripled, and by the autumn of 1916, the number of guided tours had reached approximately 350. Visits from the Imperial family, including the Crown Prince and his wife, soon confirmed the monastery's reputation as the most important gallery in eastern Germany. In 1916, Secker petitioned the city authorities to confer on him the title of director of both Danzig museums. This title meant that the Museum of Decorative Arts was subordinated to the Municipal Museum, and in 1921, they were merged into a single institution.

Secker's zeal to fulfill a mission (″to become a guide to artistic vision and discernment″) led him to a lively lecture schedule, even in the provinces. With Karl Jellinek, the renowned natural scientist from the Danzig University of Technology, he founded the city's adult education center (one of the first in the Reich), where he served as a lecturer in art history for many years. On 2 November 1918, he founded the Society for Art Research (Kunstforschende Gesellschaft zu Danzig), whose publications focused primarily on the Vistula region and the neighboring coastal areas. When he left Danzig in 1922, the society unanimously appointed him an honorary member.

=== Museum director in Cologne (1922–1928) ===
Secker's appointment to the Wallraf–Richartz Museum took place on 3 April 1922. Mixed with the congratulations and recommendations of older colleagues were expressions of concern. They pointed to the difficult terrain of local art politics on the Rhine, to unsatisfactory conditions in the museum sector, the rectification of which would require a high degree of diplomacy and strong willpower. Indeed, Secker's tenure in the following years proved to be an exhausting (and ultimately futile) struggle against narrow-minded civic sentiment and an anti-art administration. The initial situation at his inauguration was similar to that ten years earlier in the West Prussian Hanseatic city. Like the collections in the Danzig monastery, the surviving holdings of the Cologne gallery had been without a qualified director for an extended period. Since the early death of Alfred Hagelstange (1874–1914), his position, which he had held for seven years, had remained vacant. Its latest acquisitions of modern art had been stored during the war in the inaccessible, dusty director's office, which Secker promptly integrated into the museum's official collection.

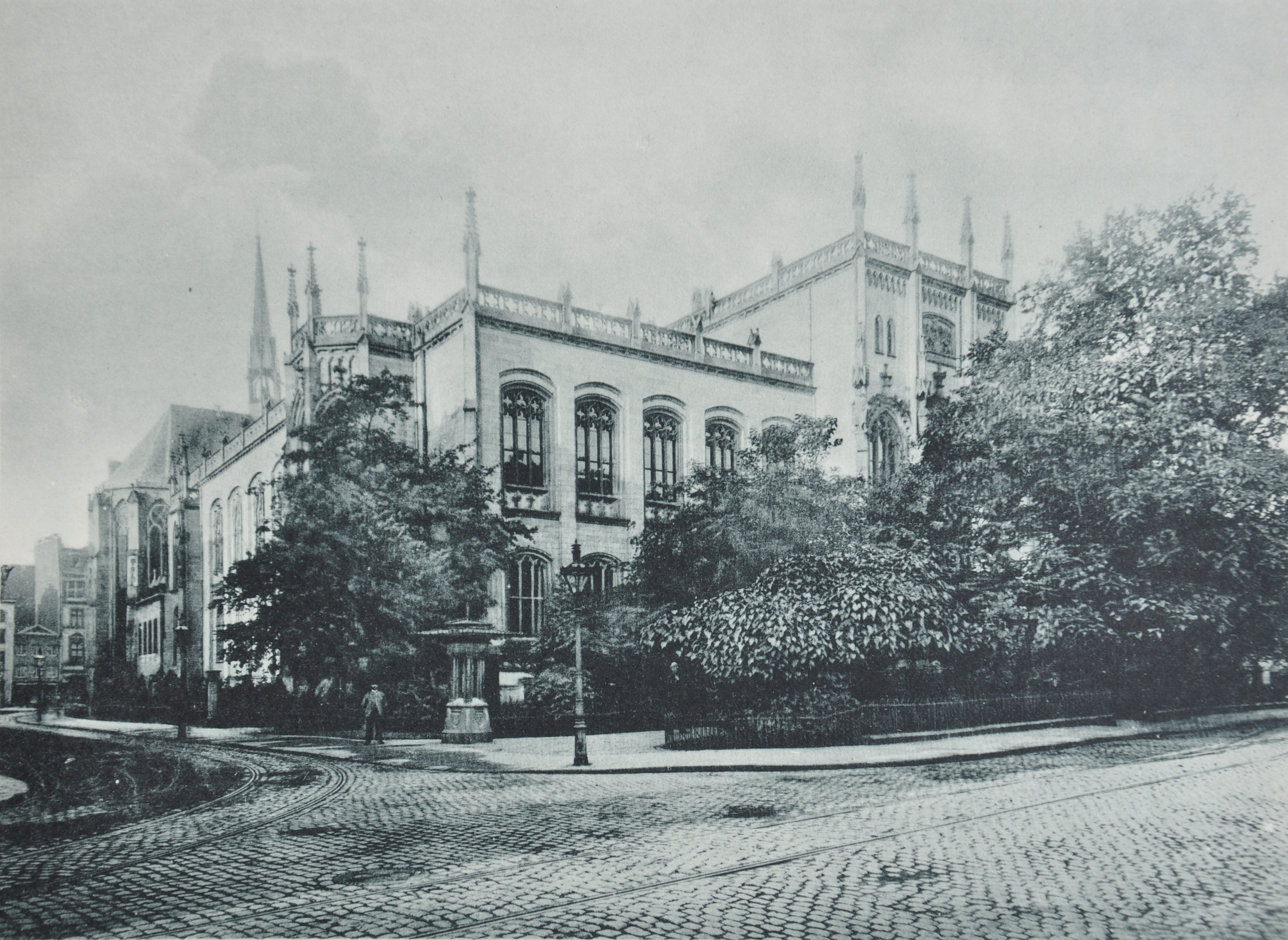
Wallraf–Richartz Museum, destroyed in night-time bombing raids in 1943

In his first year in office, he was able to draw on his experiences in Danzig. Both the structural changes to the gallery and the reorganization of its holdings, the principle of chronological arrangement of the galleries, and even the color scheme of the exhibition walls, corresponded to his Danzig designs. A first conflict with Mayor Konrad Adenauer concerned the redesign of the building. In the months-long dispute over the superior concept (Plan A versus Plan B), the city council finally had to decide in the summer of 1923, with all factions arguing against the mayor's organizational plan (City Councillor Fuchs, a member of the Council of Justice, remarked: "He will never forgive you for this"). Initially available capital, some of it painstakingly obtained from the auction of surplus museum works, had dwindled as a result of the prevailing progressive inflation. The delay in the reorganization was a major factor in the late ceremonial opening of the redesigned gallery in the museum, which finally took place on 1 December 1923.

The museum was under the responsibility of two directors. Secker was in charge of the gallery of 17th to 20th century art, including the graphic arts collections, while Professor Karl Schäfer, appointed from Lübeck in 1920 and also director of the Cologne Museum of Decorative Arts, oversaw the medieval department. The two directors were of equal rank and deputized for each other, which, due to the lack of a clearly defined division of labor, could lead to internal conflicts, especially given their differing temperaments. In the case of Schäfer and Secker, an older, temperamental man stood in contrast to a younger, highly ambitious, and very sensitive one. Indeed, the relationship between the two directors during their tenure was characterized by rivalry and discord. It was likely only after their departure that they learned their conflicts had been further fueled by the intrigues of their staff. The root of the discord, however, ultimately lay in the unclear measures that the city of Cologne had implemented and maintained for years in the administration of its museums.

Secker had started with great enthusiasm. In November 1922, he founded the Wallraf-Richartz Society, which set itself the task of promoting art historical research and interest in contemporary art in the Rhineland region. Since 1924, the Society had offered its members the annual Wallraf-Richartz Yearbook (a tradition continued by the current publication of the same name by the Friends of the Museum). Secker's ambition to establish a modern, metropolitan gallery and to include works by contemporary artists in the acquisition of paintings did not find favor with the administration or the public. While the initial additions to the collection, featuring works by Hofer, Pechstein, Purrmann, Grosz, and Rodin, may have attracted little attention, his purchase of the monumental painting The Trench caused an unprecedented scandal that stirred the art world far beyond Cologne. The nearly wall-sized painting by artist Otto Dix, a projection of his traumatic front-line experience in World War I, was the main attraction of the newly opened gallery and soon sparked controversy in the Cologne daily press. When the work was loaned to Berlin in the spring of 1924 and exhibited at the Academy of Arts, a nationwide debate ignited, fueled by the rigorous criticism of the renowned art historian and publicist Julius Meier-Graefe. Meier-Graefe attacked Secker as ″the immature gallery director from the provinces″, and the ″aging″ Academy president Max Liebermann, who he accused of condoning ″filth.″ The painting's powerful imagery (″horror in its purest form″) provoked diametrically opposed interpretations, some viewing it as ″public outrage.″

He completed his habilitation in 1924. Due to disagreements with Mayor Adenauer (ranging from plans for the expansion of the museum building to the format and thematic scope of exhibitions, particularly the Gallery of Contemporary Art he was establishing), he resigned from his full-time position on 1 February 1928, on health grounds.

=== Later years (1929–1960) ===
He lived in Cologne from 1929, in Bad Honnef from 1932, and in Weissensee near Füssen, in the Allgäu region of Bavaria, from 1956.

He wrote numerous articles and essays in catalogs, magazines, and newspapers: until World War II, he was a regular contributor to the Vossische Zeitung, Berlin, the Kölnische Zeitung, and the Neue Zürcher Zeitung. As a professor and visiting lecturer, he gave lectures at the State Academy of Applied Arts in Berlin-Weißensee (Kunsthochschule Berlin-Weißensee) in 1951. In addition, numerous publications appeared in book form, in anthologies, and in journals. He also contributed to the Thieme-Becker Artists' Lexicon (Allgemeines Lexikon der bildenden Künstler von der Antike bis zur Gegenwart).

=== Family ===
Secker married three times: he married Annie Elisabeth ("Lizzie") Wollstatt from Zurich in 1921; in London, on 26 April 1929, he married Ilse von Andreae née von Mallinckrodt from Cologne, who died on 7 February 1940 at Bad Honnef; in 1940, he married the illustrator Gerda Schroeder from Berlin. He had one daughter from his first marriage and two daughters and a son from his third.

He died at the age of 71 on 7 August 1960 in Pfronten, in the district of Ostallgäu, Bavaria.

== Works ==
- Die frühen Bauformen der Gotik in Schwaben, insbesondere ihr Zusammenhang mit Details aus der Straßburger Münster-Bauhütte (1910)
- Die Skulpturen des Straßburger Münsters seit der französischen Revolution, mit zwei Nachträgen über gotische Porträts und über Bildnereien der Renaissance und des Barock (1912)
- Führer durch die öffentlichen Kunstsammlungen in Danzig. Bd. 1: Die städtische Gemäldegalerie im Franziskanerkloster (1913}
- Die alte Töpferkunst Danzigs und seiner Nachbarstädte (1915)
- Die Kunstsammlungen im Franziskanerkloster zu Danzig: Wegweiser (1917)
- Das Danziger Uphagenhaus (1918)
- Malerei von etwa 1860 bis zur Gegenwart aus Kölner Privatbesitz (1925)
- Die Galerie der Neuzeit im Museum Wallraf-Richartz (1927)
- Gebaute Bilder: Grundlage für eine kommende Wandmalerei (1934)
- Julius Bretz (1956)
- Diego Rivera (1957)
- José Guadelupe Posada (1961)

== Awards ==
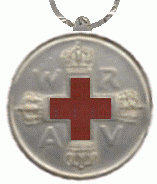
Red Cross Medal (Prussia), 2nd Class

- Red Cross Medal (Prussia), 2nd Class (1919)
- Bronze Medal of Honor for Services to the Austrian Red Cross (1919)
- Honorary Member of the Kunstforschenden Gesellschaft in Danzig (1922)
- Honorary Member of the Wallraf-Richartz Society in Cologne (1928)

== See also ==
- National Museum, Gdańsk
- Wallraf–Richartz Museum
- The Trench (Dix)
