= The Ambassadors (Holbein) =

1533 painting by Hans Holbein

- Artist: Hans Holbein the Younger
- Year: 1533
- Medium: Oil on oak
- Dimensions: 207 cm × 209.5 cm (81 in × 82.5 in)
- Condition: Restored 1996
- Location: National Gallery, London
- Website: National Gallery page

The Ambassadors is a 1533 painting by Hans Holbein the Younger. Also known as Jean de Dinteville and Georges de Selve, after the two people it portrays, it was created in the Tudor period, in the same year Elizabeth I was born. Franny Moyle speculates that Elizabeth's mother, Anne Boleyn, then Queen of England, might have commissioned it as a gift for Jean de Dinteville, the French ambassador, portrayed on the left. De Selve was a Catholic bishop.

As well as being a double portrait, the painting contains a still life of meticulously rendered objects, the meaning of which is the cause of much debate. An array of expensive scientific objects, related to knowing the time and the cosmos are prominently displayed. Several refer to Rome, the seat of the Pope. A second shelf of objects shows a lute with a broken string, a symbol of discord, next to a hymnal composed by Martin Luther.

It incorporates one of the best-known examples of anamorphosis in painting. While most scholars have taken the view that the painting should be viewed side on to see the skull, others believe a glass tube was used to see the skull head on. Either way, death is both prominent and obscured until discovered. Less easily spotted is a carving of Jesus on a crucifix, half hidden behind a curtain at the top left.

The Ambassadors has been part of London's National Gallery collection since its purchase in 1890. It was extensively restored in 1997, leading to criticism, in particular that the skull's dimensions had been changed.

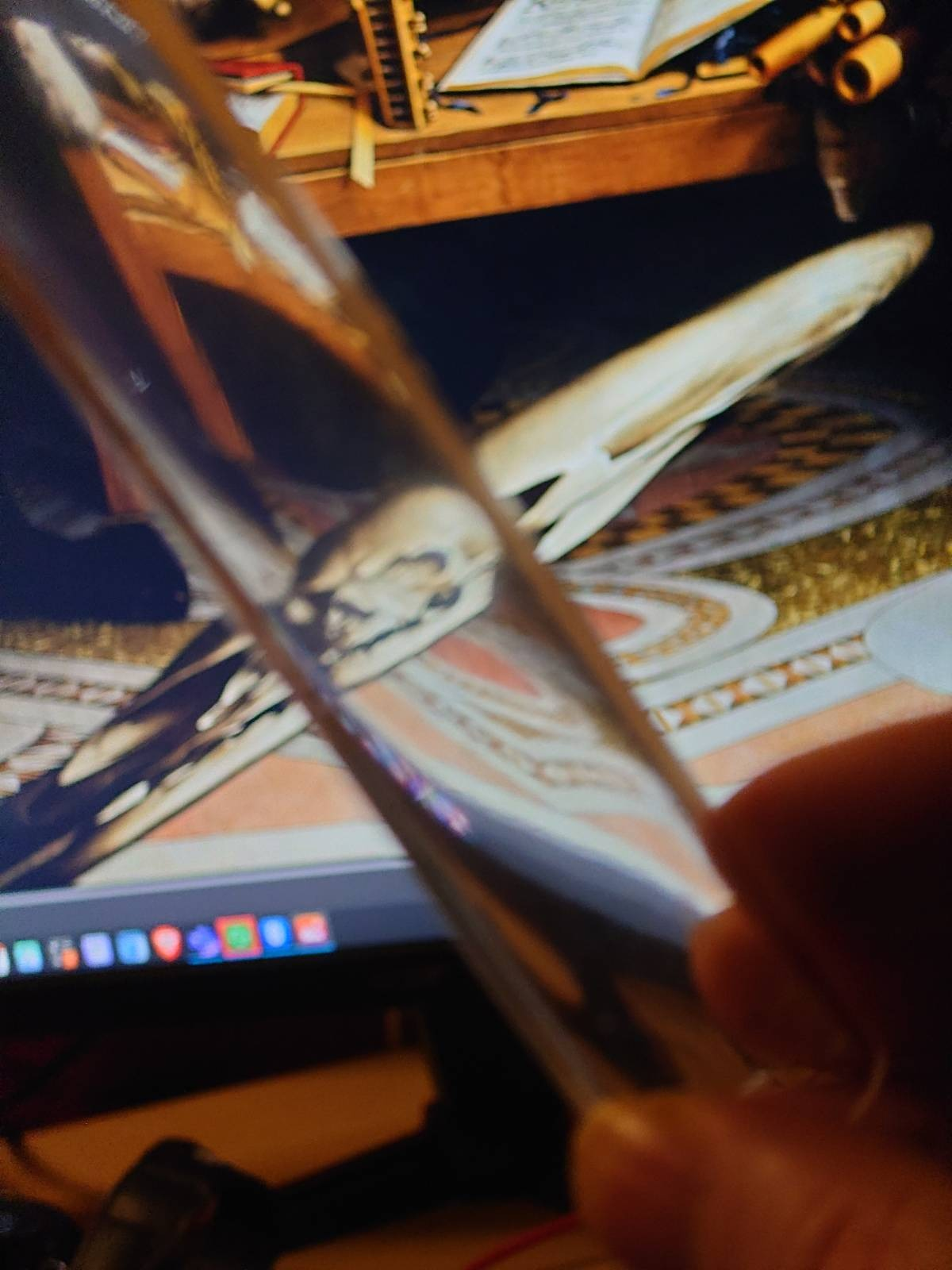
Demonstration of how the skull image in "The Ambassadors" may be viewed head on, through a tube

== Description ==
Though he was a German-born artist who spent much of his time in England, Holbein here displays the influence of Early Netherlandish painting. He used oils which for panel paintings had been developed a century before in Early Netherlandish painting, and just as Jan van Eyck and the Master of Flémalle used extensive imagery to link their subjects to religious concepts, Holbein used symbolic objects around the figures to suggest mostly secular ideas and interests.

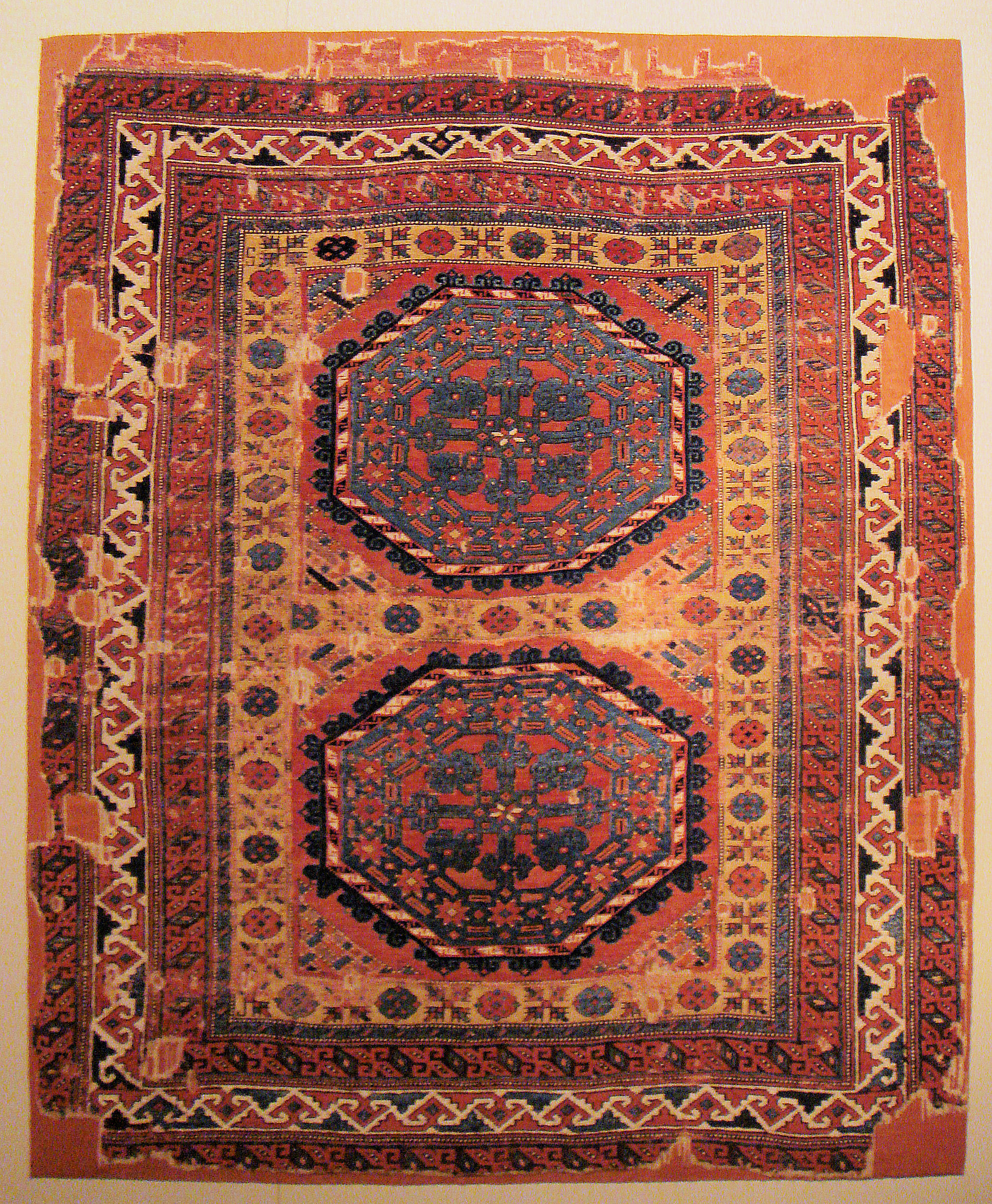
Holbein carpet with large medallions, of a type similar to that of the painting, 16th century, Central Anatolia

Among the clues to the figures' associations are a selection of scientific instruments including two globes (one terrestrial and one celestial), a shepherd's dial, a quadrant, a torquetum, and a polyhedral sundial, as well as various textiles. The floor mosaic is based on a design from Westminster Abbey—the Cosmati pavement, before the High Altar. Biographer Eric Ives suggests that Holbein included the pattern from this distinctive area of floor as a reference to the forthcoming coronation of Anne Boleyn, as it was at the location in the Abbey reserved for the ceremony. The carpet on the upper shelf is an example of a "Holbein carpet"—an Anatolian carpet often depicted in the artist's paintings. The figure on the left is in secular attire while the figure on the right is dressed in clerical clothes. They flank the table, which displays open books and symbols of religious knowledge, including a symbolic link to the Virgin. Near the top left corner, a crucifix can be seen, partially covered by the curtain.

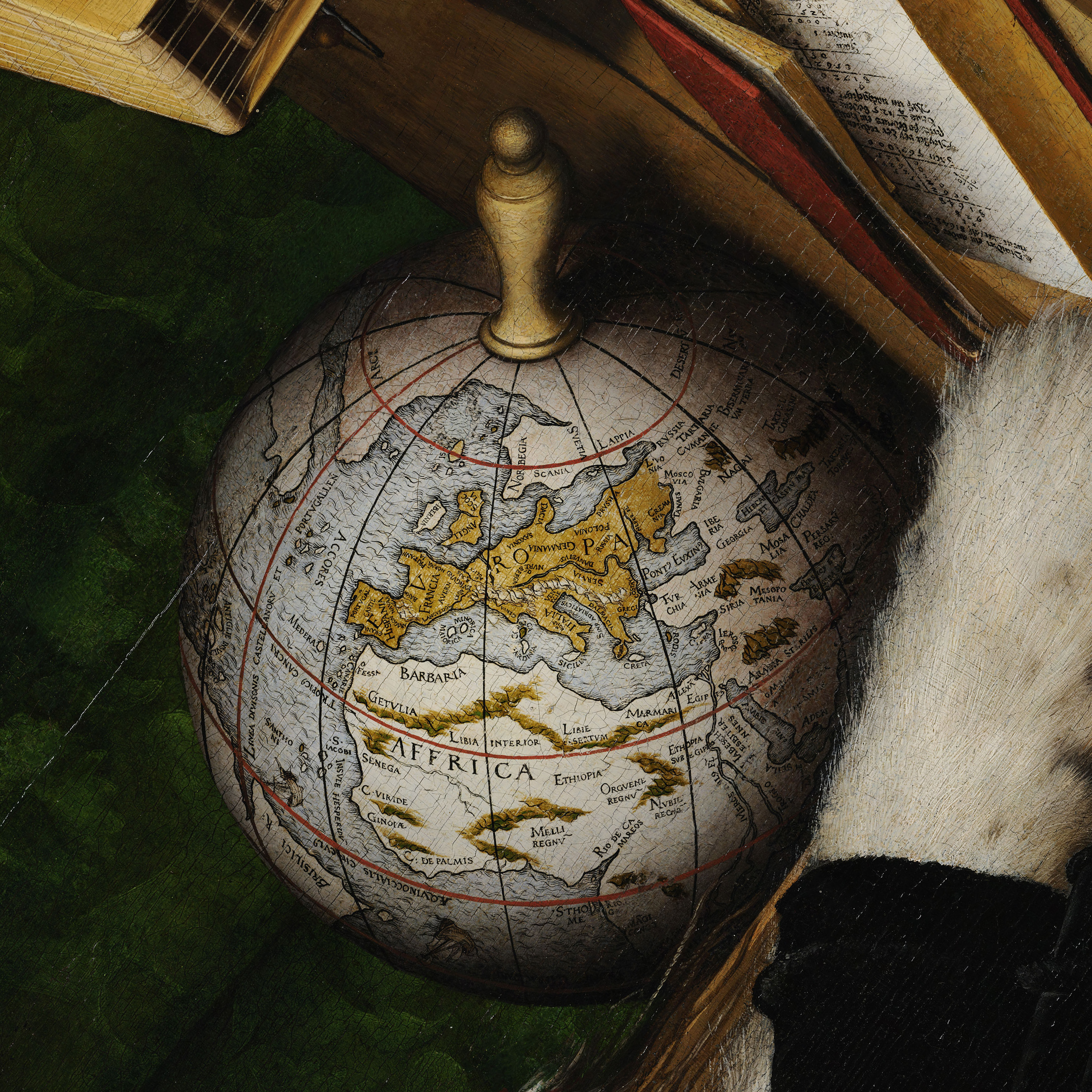
The Ambassadors' globe (detail)

In contrast, other scholars have suggested the painting contains overtones of religious strife. The conflicts between secular and religious authorities are here represented by Jean de Dinteville, a landowner, and Georges de Selve, the Bishop of Lavaur. The commonly accepted symbol of discord, a lute with a broken string, is included next to a hymnbook in Martin Luther's translation, suggesting strife between scholars and the clergy. For others, if the lute's broken string suggests the interruption of religious harmony, the Lutheran hymnal, open on facing pages reproducing a song on the Commandments (Law) and one on the Holy Spirit (Grace) may suggest their being in "harmony" with each other.

The terrestrial globe on the lower shelf repeats a portion of a cartographically imaginative map created in possibly 1530 and of unknown origin. The map is referred to as the Ambassadors' Globe due to its popularly known appearance in the painting.

The work has been described as "one of the most staggeringly impressive portraits in Renaissance art."

=== Anamorphic skull ===
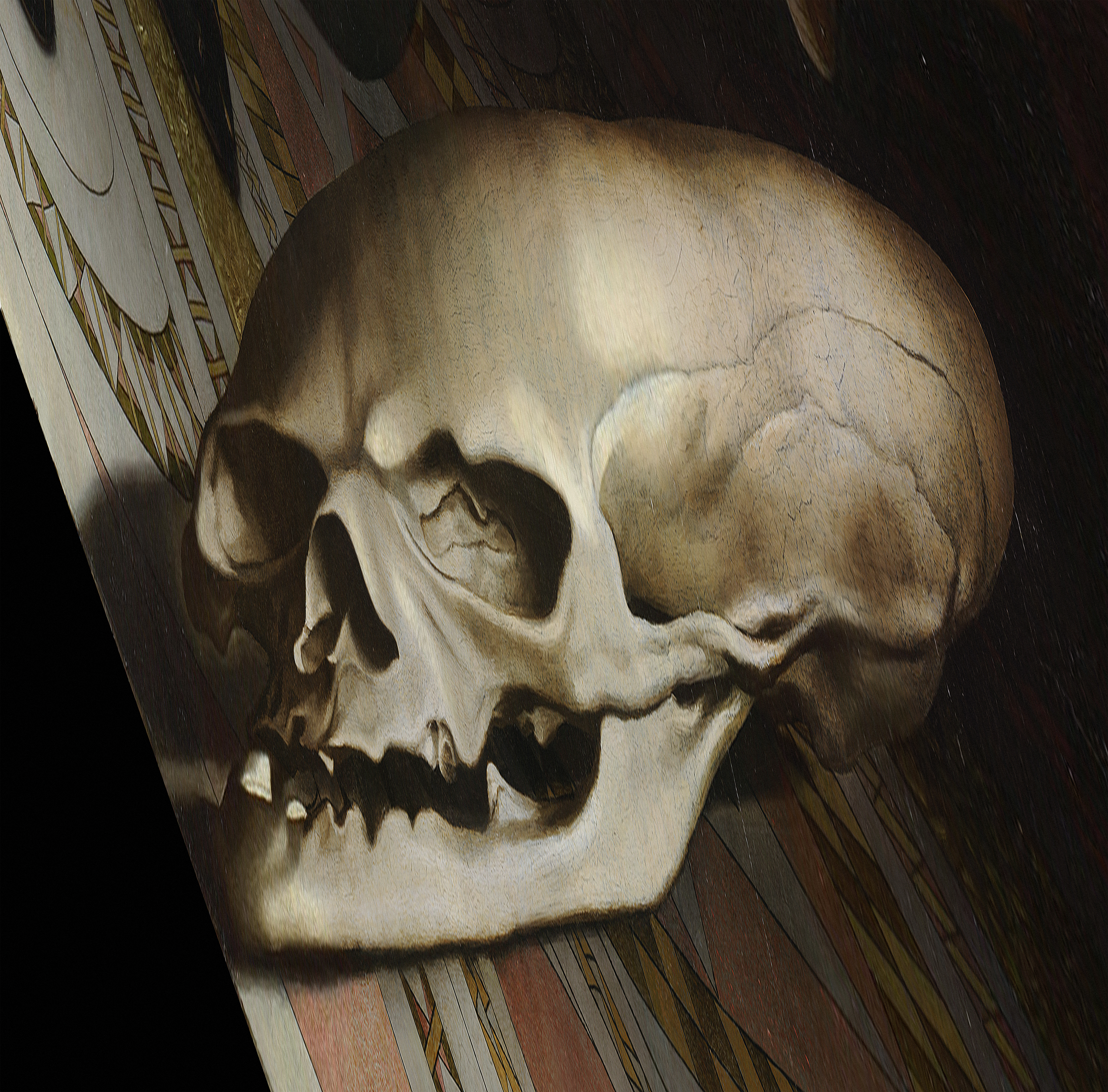
The anamorphic skull as restored in 1997, viewed here at an oblique angle

The most notable and famous of Holbein's symbols in the work is the distorted skull which is placed in the bottom centre of the composition. The skull, rendered in anamorphic perspective, another invention of the Early Renaissance, is meant to be a visual puzzle as the viewer must approach the painting from high on the right side, or low on the left side, to see the form as an accurate rendering of a human skull. While the skull is evidently intended as a vanitas or memento mori, it is unclear why Holbein gave it such prominence in this painting. A simple explanation is that "memento mori" was de Dinteville's motto, while another possibility is that this painting represents three levels: the heavens as portrayed by the astrolabe and other objects on the upper shelf, the living world as evidenced by books and a musical instrument on the lower shelf, and death signified by the skull.

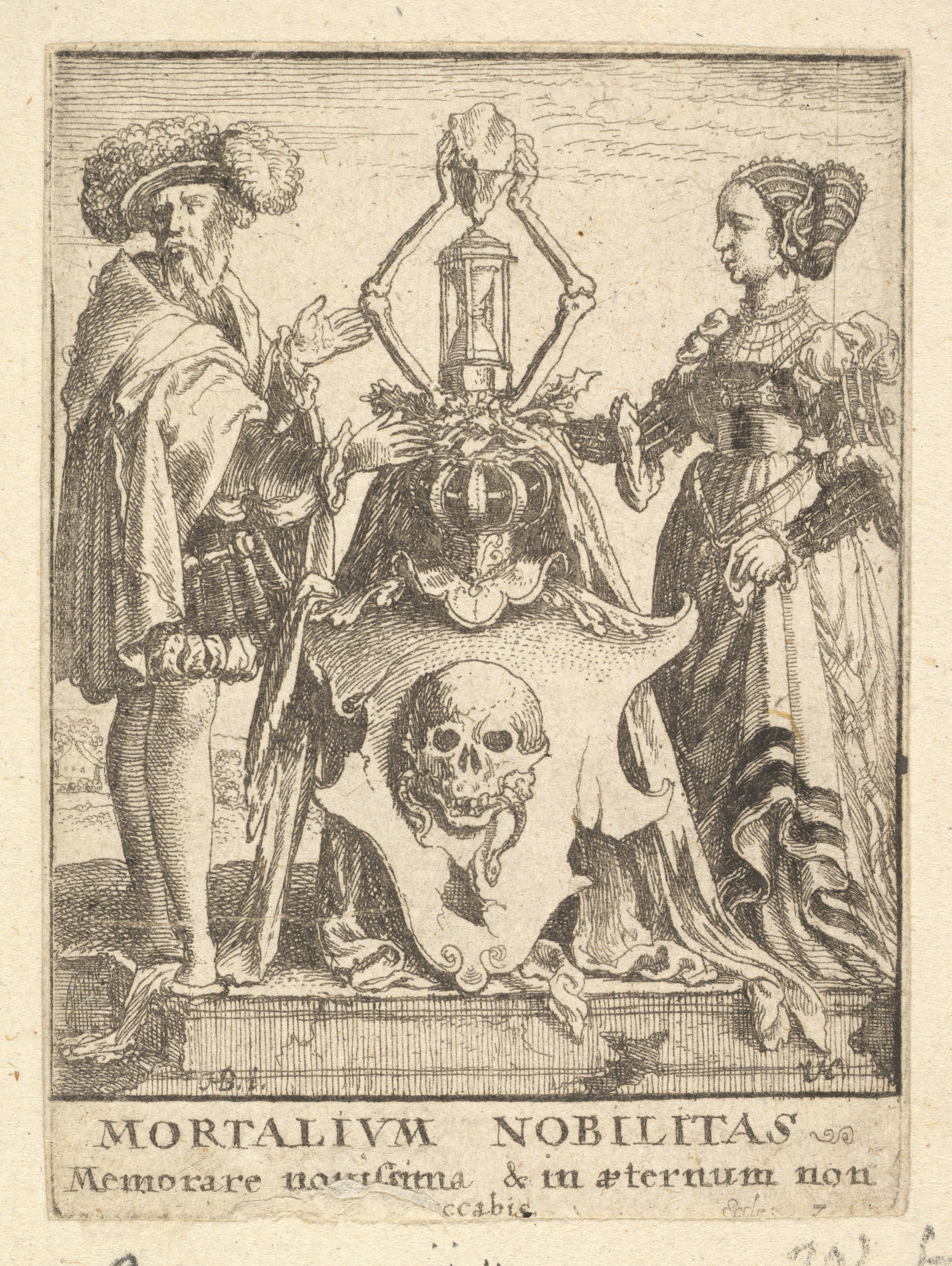
The Ambassadors' composition has often been compared with Holbein's Arms of Death.

Artists often incorporated skulls as a reminder of mortality. Holbein may have intended the skulls (one as a gray slash and the other as a medallion on Jean de Dinteville's hat) and the crucifix in the upper left corner to encourage contemplation of one's impending death and the resurrection. The question remains however why the gray slash is only visible from the side. One possibility is that Holbein simply wished to show off his ability with the technique in order to secure future commissions. The painting may have been designed to hang beside a doorway, or even in a stairwell, so that persons entering the room or walking up the stairs and passing the painting on their left would be confronted by the appearance of the skull. However, a viewing place that would provide the correct elevation, such as a suitable staircase for instance, has not been identified at Dinteville's chateau at Polisy; it seems unlikely that one would have existed. The side view theory may have some other problems. Arguably, the skull as viewed from the side does not properly take account of perspective, and even at the most extreme viewing angle, the skull can be considered as somewhat stretched.

A further theory suggested by Edgar Samuel in 1962 is that it was intended to be viewed through a special optic. There are other examples of similar devices, although not identical, being used at the time. Samuel describes an account of another painting that used a viewing optic, recorded in 1602. Working with the Warburg Institute and the British Optical Association, they ruled out complex optical devices, but determined that a simple, hollow glass tube would be able to produce the correct optical effects, and that such tubes were available and known at the time. (Note: To demonstrate the effect, a clear perspex tube of 30 cm length, 25 mm diameter and 3 mm thickness can be used.) It is possible to view the skull correctly from face on, using a perspex or glass tube optic at arms length. This resolves the skull more realistically than when seen from the side, without the distortion that can be seen in the skull picture above. In the black and white image, it can be seen that the skull has more natural dimensions.

Samuel adds that, in his view, "the composition of the painting is altered for the better", as the skull, earth and celestial globes become suggestively aligned, and the tube points towards De Dinteville, making him the focus of the painting. The line created by the tube balances with the anamorphosis. (Note: Samuel concludes that the viewer sees the representatives of "wealth and power in state and church" at the "height of their powers", the tools of science and knowledge sit at the centre, and "in the glass, is the skull of death, at once a reminder of the transience of worldly glory, a brilliant demonstration of artistic skill and a fascinating scientific toy.") While the theory remains "reasonable but unproved", Agrippa von Nettesheim wrote in 1533 of various kinds of trick glass "daily seen" including "pillar fashion'd" perspective glasses, in a work "apparently known" to Holbein and his circle. Potential objections to the optic theory include that the image produced is small, and that there are no books on anamorphis published describing this method; and lastly that understanding of lens optics is relatively late. It is also possible that it could be coincidence, as other images designed to work side-on are also rendered reasonably well by the kind of lens proposed by Samuel.

==== Restoration of the skull ====
The research and processes used in the 1997 restoration of the skull are described in detail in the National Gallery Technical Bulletin, volume 19 (1998). Restorers encountered difficulties with this area of the painting because sections were heavily degraded beneath earlier restorations. Consequently, this work was left as the final stage of the process to allow time for consultation and debate. After cleaning, it was found that only small losses had occurred in some areas of the skull, and these were retouched. However, a large area—including part of the lower jaw and the nasal cavity—was missing. Here, the restorers opted to recalculate the image's features to fill the gaps, providing viewers with a sense of the effect Holbein had intended. Easily removable materials were used for this. A distorted perspective of a modern photograph of a skull provided the basis for the image, which was then adjusted to fit the remaining fragments of original paint. Following the restoration, the skull remained interpretable to the eye via either side-viewing or the use of a lens.

Mathematician John Sharp suggested that vital evidence regarding the way the projection was created may have been lost during the restoration. The methods by which the new skull projection was produced using the modern photograph, having more complete dentition, probably moved the overall dimensions of the jaw line. Sharp concluded that understanding of perspective among art restorers was lacking, and they would benefit from a more complete knowledge of mathematics and optics.

=== The two subjects ===
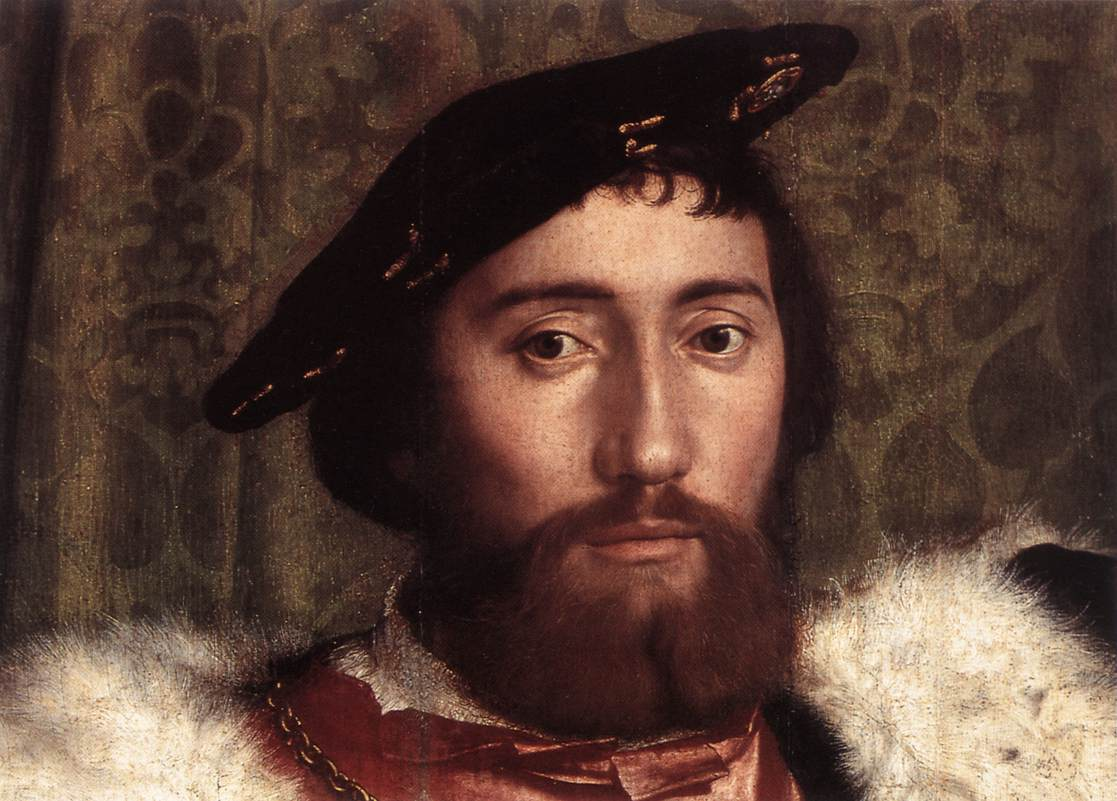
Jean de Dinteville, Seigneur of Polisy (1504–1555), French ambassador to the court of Henry VIII for most of 1533, whose identity was proposed by Sidney Colvin in 1890 and confirmed by Mary Hervey in 1900.

Before the publication of Mary F. S. Hervey's Holbein's Ambassadors: The Picture and the Men in 1900, the identity of the two figures in the picture had long been a subject of intense debate. In 1890, Sidney Colvin was the first to propose the figure on the left as Jean de Dinteville, Seigneur of Polisy (1504–1555), French ambassador to the court of Henry VIII for most of 1533. Shortly afterwards, the cleaning of the picture revealed that his seat of Polisy is one of only four French places marked on the globe.

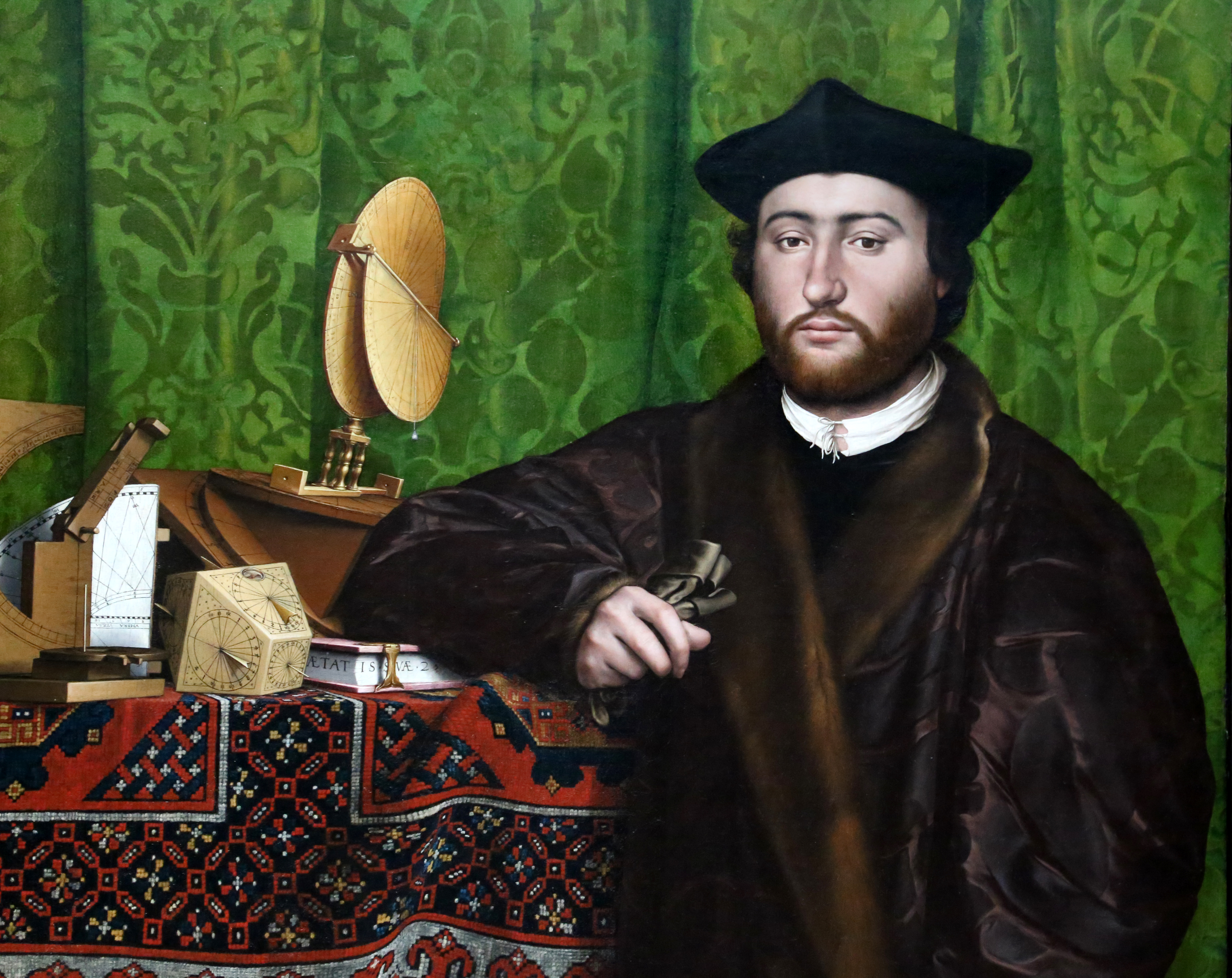
Hervey identified the other figure as Georges de Selve in 1900

Hervey identified the man on the right as Georges de Selve (1508/09–1541), Bishop of Lavaur, after tracing the painting's history back to a seventeenth-century manuscript. According to the art historian John Rowlands, de Selve is not wearing episcopal robes because he was not consecrated until 1534. De Selve is known from two of de Dinteville's letters to his brother François de Dinteville (1498-1556), Bishop of Auxerre, to have visited London in the spring of 1533. On 23 May, Jean de Dinteville wrote: "Monsieur de Lavaur did me the honour of coming to see me, which was no small pleasure to me. There is no need for the grand maître to hear anything of it". The grand maître in question was Anne de Montmorency, the Marshal of France, a reference that has led some analysts to conclude that de Selve's mission was a secret one; but there is no other evidence to corroborate the theory. On 4 June the ambassador wrote to his brother again, saying: "Monsieur de Lavaur came to see me, but has gone away again".

Hervey's identification of the sitters has remained the standard one, affirmed in extended studies of the painting by Foister, Roy, and Wyld (1997), Zwingenberger (1999), and North (2004), who concludes that "the general coherence of the evidence assembled by Hervey is very satisfying"; however, North also notes that, despite Hervey's research, "Rival speculation did not stop at once and is still not entirely dead". Giles Hudson, for example, has argued that the man on the right is not de Selve, but Jean's brother François, Bishop of Auxerre, a noted patron of the arts with a known interest in mathematical instruments. The identification finds support in the earliest manuscript in which the painting is mentioned, a 1589 inventory of the Chateau of Polisy, discovered by Riccardo Famiglietti. However, scholars have argued that this identification of 1589 was incorrect. John North, for example, remarks that "This was a natural enough supposition to be made by a person with limited local knowledge, since the two brothers lived on the family estates together at the end of their lives, but it is almost certainly mistaken". He points to a letter François de Dinteville wrote to Jean on 28 March 1533, in which he talks of an imminent meeting with the Pope and makes no mention of visiting London. Unlike the man on the right of the picture, François was older than Jean de Dinteville. The inscription on the man on the right's book is "AETAT/IS SV Æ 25" (his age is 25); that on de Dinteville's dagger is "AET. SV Æ/ 29" (he is 29).

=== The globes ===
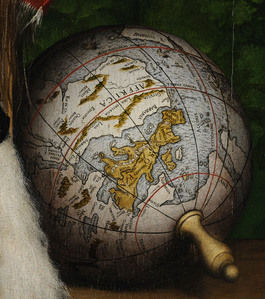
Detail - Terrestrial Globe - from The Ambassadors - Holbein

The terrestrial globe is positioned upside down, and marks the chateau of Polisy, the family home of de Dinteville. This was the clue that led Hervey to identify the two figures in the painting, along with his stays in France. The chateau is however placed incorrectly, placed at the north east, rather than south east of Paris as it should be, and is labelled upside down, meaning it can be read more easily by the viewer. Just as significantly, the globe's view centres on Rome. The handle on the globe was not painted by Holbein, but is an addition by an early restorer that the National Gallery opted to leave during its restoration.

The terrestrial globe is generally identified as having been made by Johannes Schöner but others have preferred Georg Hartmann of Nuremberg. (Note: To identify the map designer, comparison with the pictured globe is made with known prints from woodcut gores. Dekker and Lippincott express a preference for Schöner, believing that there may be evidence to suggest that it was from an unidentified design, incorporating elements of existing maps of prior and later dates. See Dekker & Lippincott 1999, pp. 94–7)

The celestial globe can also be identified as being made by Schöner. As the symbols for stars are simple, and only in two forms, either circles or stars, it can be deduced that it was made from woodcut gores, which is unusual for celestial globes; Schöner is the only manufacturer known to have done so in the period. Extant prints from gores confirm the design is consistent with his work. The globe shows a cock, (Note: US Rooster) which should be marked in Latin Gallina, an ancient symbol of France. Nearby is a term, Galacia, sometimes interpreted as a deliberate change to the map and a pun on Gallia, i.e. France. However, comparison with the extant gores shows in fact the label is correct and identifies the Milky Way.

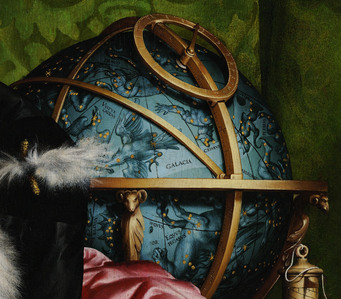
Celestial globe

Scholars have often argued that the celestial globe is placed to indicate a particular time and date, which may help understand some of the hidden meanings in the painting. However, an alternative explanation is that the horizon ring is set to 42º N, 48º from the equator, being the latitude for Rome as understood by contemporaries. It "reflects a sky over Rome", rather than a particular date for the figures' meeting in London. This could be interpreted as an allusion to the Vatican and the "primacy of the Catholic church". Alternatively, the latitude may have been incorrectly set to indicate 48º N (rather than 48º from the equator), which would indicate Paris or Polisy.

The time of day can be understood from the celestial globe. The "hour circle" runs through the north pole, set for 2 hours 40 minutes post meridiem (2.40pm). The constellation Pegasus is seen immediately below the horizon, and its exact position allows the date to be determined as 12 July. Thus Dekker & Lippincott reject the hypothesis made by North that the date could refer to the horoscope of one of the sitters, as it does not refer to either of their birthdates.

=== The dials ===
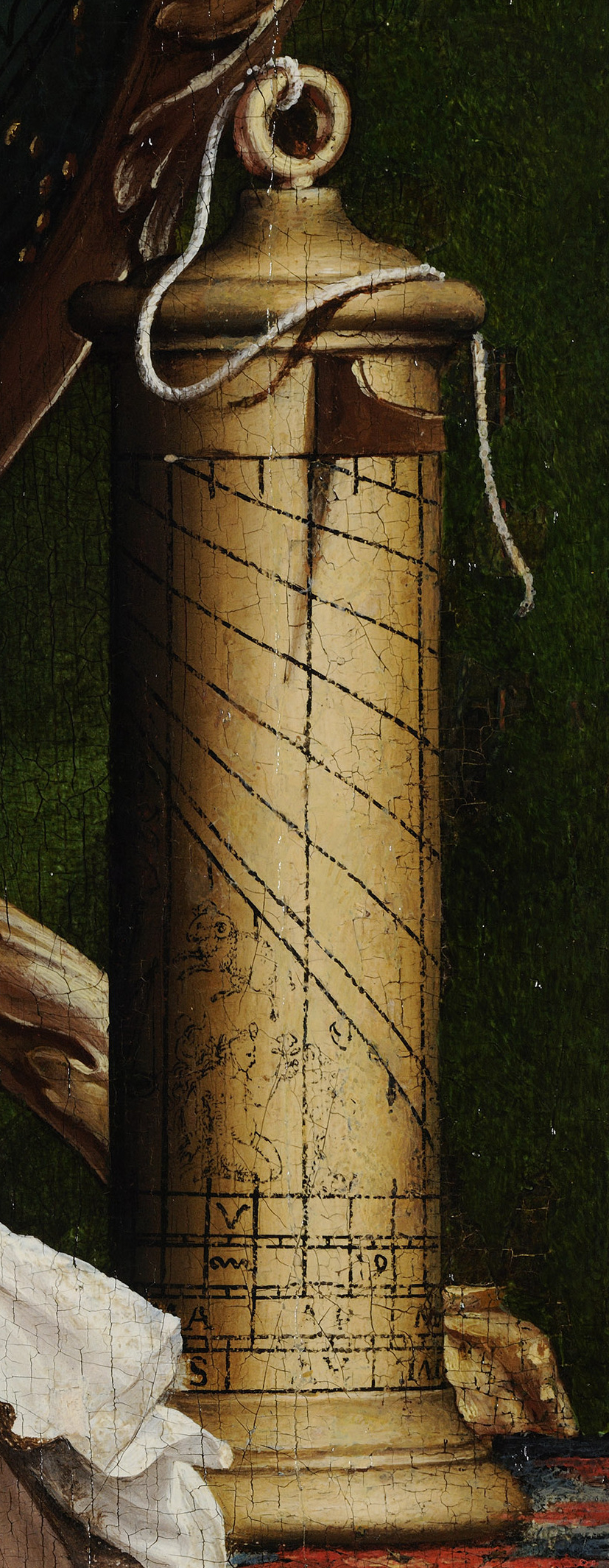
The Shepherd's dial

There are four instruments for telling the time, which would have been identifiably new and expensive, were German made, and appear to be connected with Nicolaus Kratzer.

Scholars have investigated whether the instruments indicate a particular time or day. Each of the time dials has a pointer (gnomon) which should indicate a given time, the interpretation of which is frequently held to have a significance, for instance North claims they and the picture indicate an astrological or occult analysis of Good Friday. It is worth noting however, that the sitters are indoors, and the instruments would not work without direct sunlight, a point which has not been addressed by those speculating on the underlying meanings. However there are in any case significant problems with attempts to identify dates on the objects, which were outlined by Dekker and Lippincott in 1999. Each of the devices convey either ambiguous results, or have aspects that imply that they would not be in a working condition.

The pillar dial or "Shepherd's Dial" is a simple device, designed to be carried. As it calculates the time according to the position of the sun, two dates are possible for any position, as the sun's path moves through the two halves of the year. Thus the gnomon on the pillar dial is set to the either the end of Aries and start of Taurus, or the start of Virgo and end of Leo, giving potential dates of 10 April and 15 August. Dekker and Lippincott reject North's suggestion that the date is set for the vernal equinox. Eric Ives argues that the date is set to 11 May 1533—the day Anne Boleyn was formally accorded the status of "royal" at the court of Henry VIII.

Whether the dial is meant to indicate a particular time is much harder to argue. The shadow is not generated by sunlight, and shows a curvature which is optically impossible, if a "nice visual conceit". Furthermore, to work correctly, the gnomon would have to point directly into the light source, which it does not. Otherwise, the shadow would indicate 9am or 3pm. However, as the shadow is generated in a way that is fundamentally at odds with how the device is meant to work, it seems unlikely that it was meant to indicate a particular time.

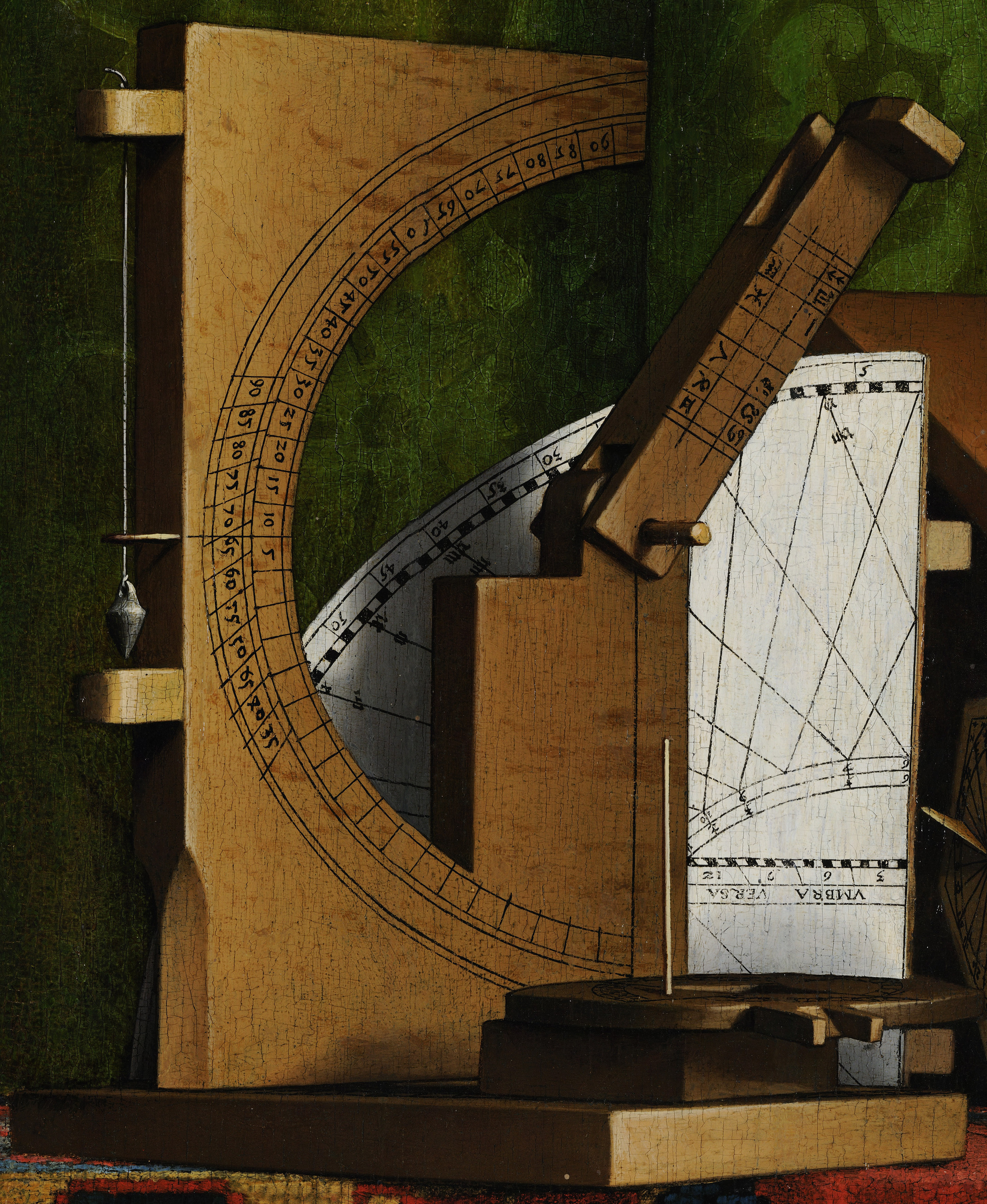
Universal equinoctial dial (disassembled, front) and Quadrant

The Universal equinoctial dial may have been designed by Kratzer, who was also painted by Holbein, and is associated with other instruments in the painting. The painting shows the plumb line on the left of the device, and two scales for adjusting the device for a particular latitude. However, the dial itself is lying in front, apparently pinned down. A similar arrangement of the same dismantled device can be seen in Holbein's Portrait of Nicolaus Kratzer. One possible reason for this is that dials from different tools can be used to help lay out dials for other tools, so it may imply that it was being used to finish some other time telling device, similar to those shown in the picture.

The horary quadrant was identified by Peter Drinkwater in 1993 as being a straight lined horarium bilimbatum, presented in a disassembled state. Dekker and Lippincott reject North's suggestion that it is a meteoroscope, for trigonometric calculations, on the grounds that it has sights, so must be for observation, rather than a calculation device. A very similar device is sketched in Kratzer's papers, now at Oxford. It is presented lying on its side, with its sights in the wrong place for use, so should be seen as a device at rest. Given the limited detail in the painting, it is not possible to know what at what latitude the quadrant would have been designed to be used.

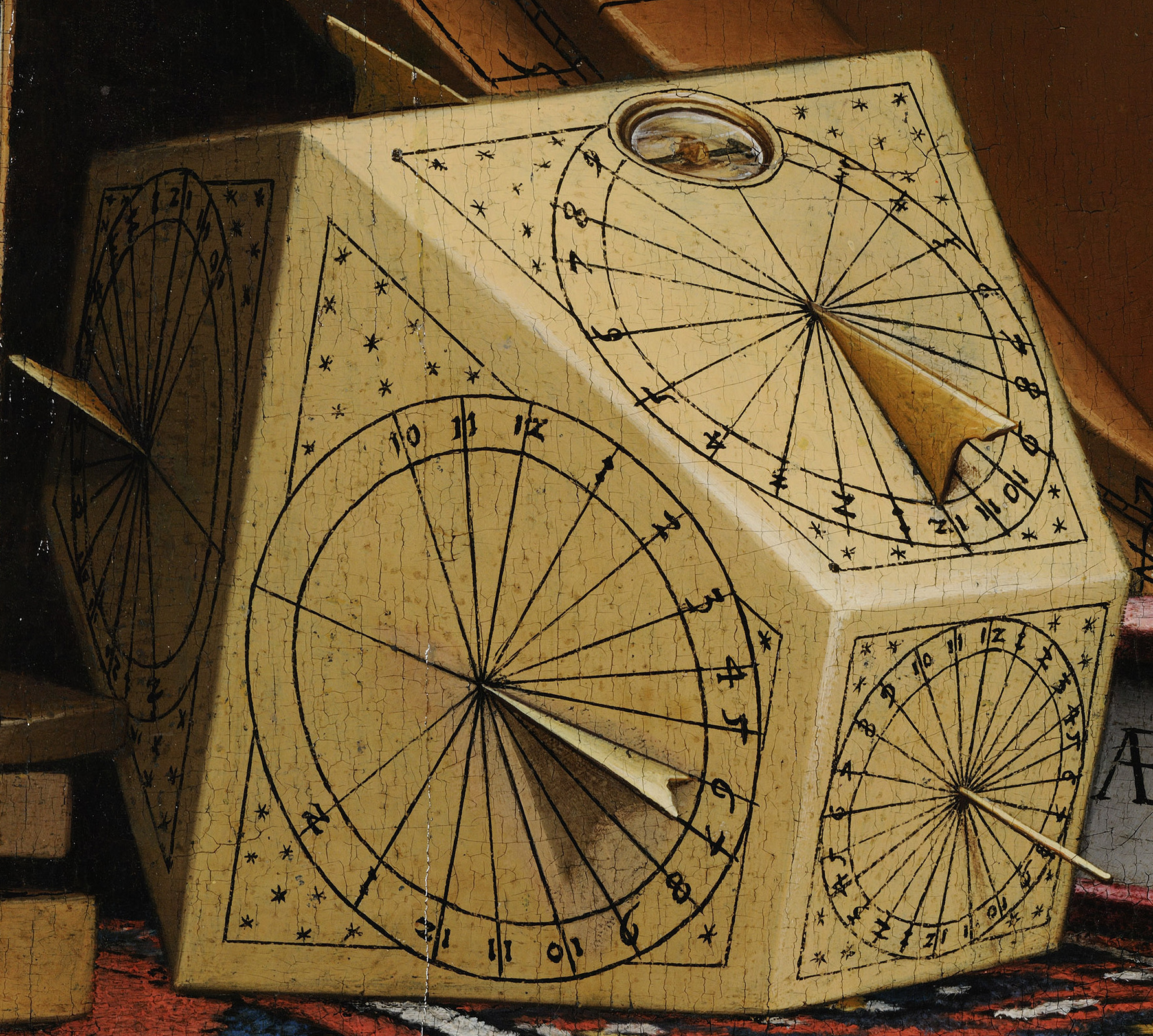
The Polyhedral sundial

The Polyhedral sundial is the most remarkable dial in the set. It is displayed with three sides clearly in view, with a gnomon's shadow pointing to values on readable scales on each. Such dials were particularly valued as a way to show the skills of their maker, Kratzer was known to have created several. However, the times indicated by the instrument differs according to the panel. Two show 10.30, but the left panel shows 9.30; the construction of the dial is such that they should all have the same result. In any case, the device should be aligned to the north pole in order to work, but it faces east-west. In any case, the panels show a partially fictitious display, as the values around the dials should not be evenly spaced, but should be more closely grouped together as they reach the narrow end of the device. This is also true for the Polyhedral sundial as shown in the Portrait of Nicolaus Kratzer.

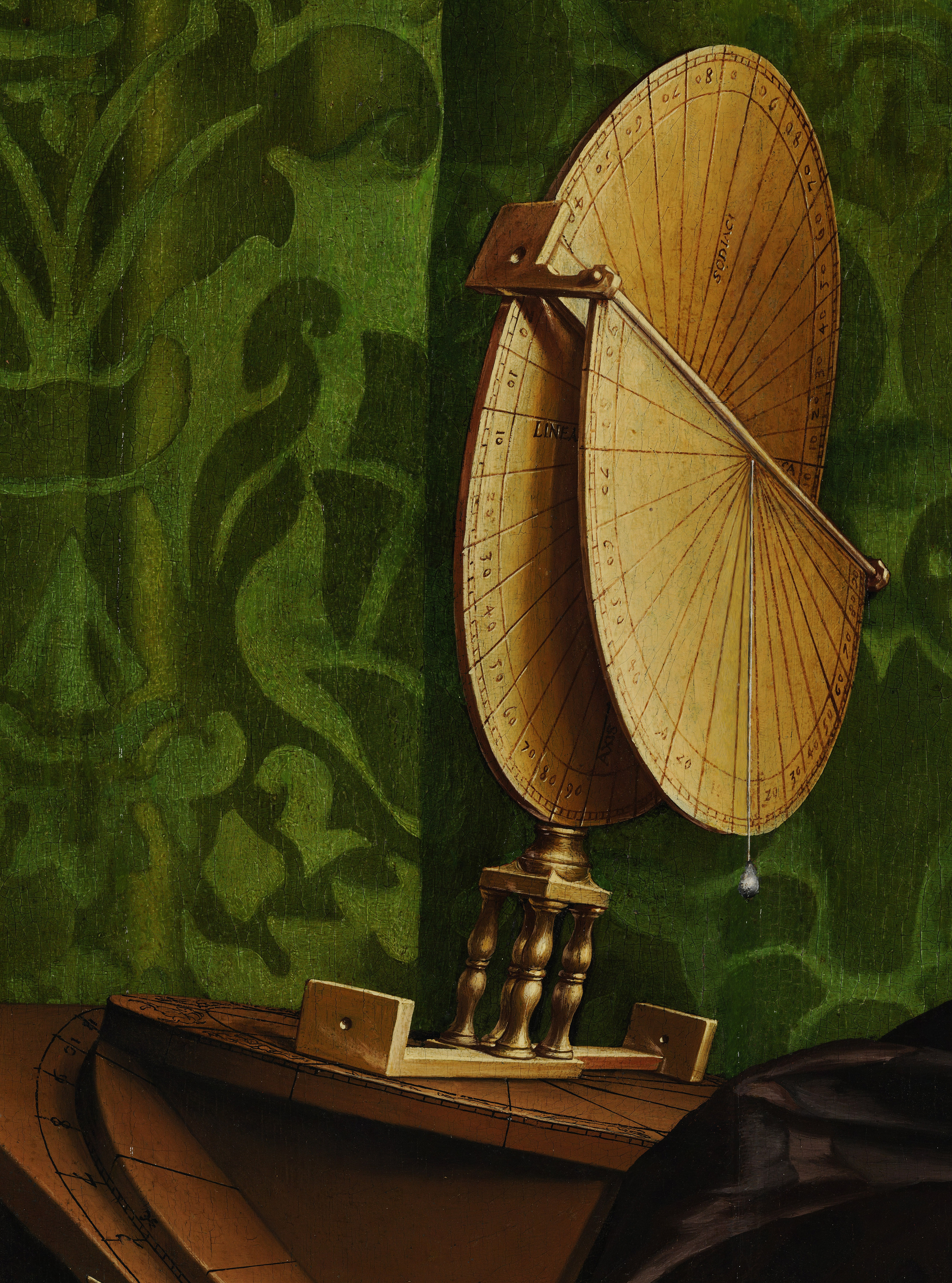
The Torquetum

The Torquetum is known from medieval descriptions, and is possibly Arabic in origin. There is dispute over its usage, but it was probably used for planetary observation, to help find the location of a planet, or to verify information recorded in tables. It appears it was used in the period 1450-1500s to locate Halley's Comet, for example, and information about its use began to circulate more widely in the early 1500s in Germany and the Netherlands. Peter Apian published a detailed description in 1533, and it appears this may have been used by Kratzer to build the model depicted. Overall, this appears to be an "indication of first-hand acquaintance with the cutting edge of European scientific thought".

It is possible that the Torquetum indicates the position of a star, planet or comet, but there is insufficient information to know for certain. An ecliptical latitude of approximately 17.5º can be seen on the sighting limb, together with a height over the horizon of circa 7.5º. These values could indicate the position of a star or comet, and Halley's Comet did appear at this location in 1531, two years previously, but this seems "tenuous at best", according to Dekker and Lippincott.

=== The lute, pipes, hymnal and arithmetic book ===
These objects, on the lower shelf, are taken together as conveying discord, related to the changes in the Christian church being brought forward through Lutheranism, of which the sitters disapproved. Lutes, like celestial globes, are normally a symbol of harmony, but the lute displayed has a just visible broken string, which is understood as a symbol of discord. The same may apply to the flutes, as one appears to be missing. Behind the lute is a pair of compasses, which can stand for good governance, or alternatively, are associated with Saturn, who is a malignant and chaotic force. On the left of the shelf is Peter Apian's arithmetic book, written for merchants, which is open at the page for "division". Standing in front of the lute is a Lutheran hymnal, turned to readable pages for the hymn Veni Sancte Spiritus and the Ten Commandments, both translated into German. These are from Johann Walter's 1524 Gestlich Gesangbuchli, published in Wittenburg. The book is changed, however, as these did not appear together, and the numbering is incorrect. (Note: Veni Sancte Spiritus should be at II, but is labelled XIX; Ten Commandments is unnumbered in the painting, but appears further in the book at XIX.)

Elements denoting discord

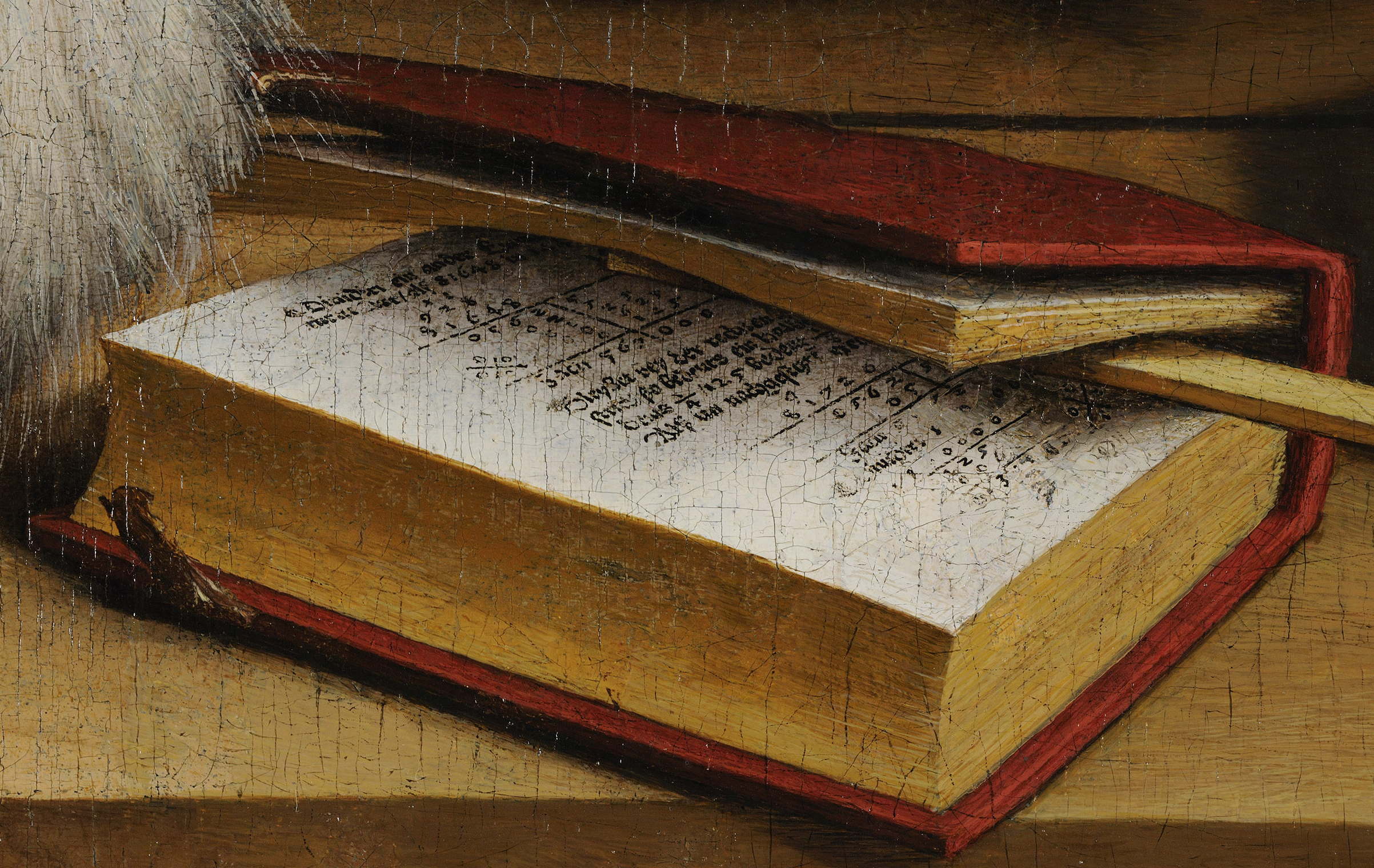
Peter Apian's arithmetic book

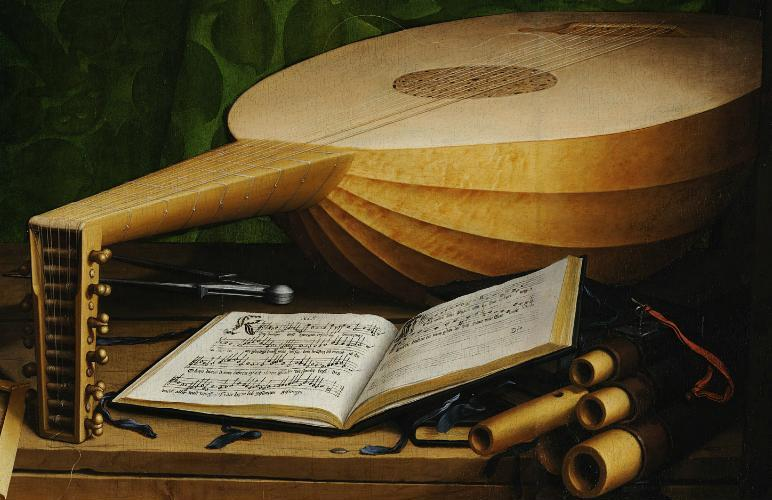
Lute with broken string

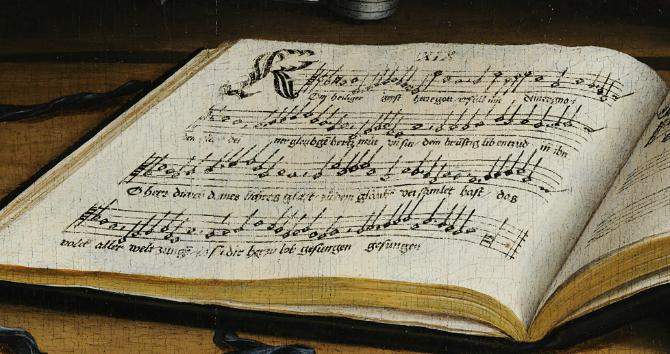
A page from the Lutheran hymnal

== History of the painting ==
The painting probably travelled back to France in 1533 when Dinteville returned home, but it is not documented at Polisy until 1589. It is recorded in Paris in 1653, then owned by Dinteville's descendant, Francois de Cazillac, who had inherited Polisy. Records of the painting next occur in 1716, when it is left in the will of Marie-Renee le Genevois. The painting was sold out of the family in 1787 in Paris, at an auction of Nicholas Beaujon's property following his death, as an additional item owned by his executor, Chretien-Francois II de Lamoignon. It was bought by an art dealer, Jean-Baptiste-Pierre Lebrun and was in England by 1792. In 1808 Buchanan sold it to the 2nd Earl of Radnor. It was finally sold in 1890 to the National Gallery.

The painting was found to be in poor condition. The wooden planks that were used for its construction were at some point pulled apart, causing considerable damage to the paintwork. The shape was warped, and curved outwards, causing gaps between the planks, which had been filled in by restorers. Large amounts of varnish had been applied and the curtains were heavily repainted. Work was done to correct the damage, remove restoration work and reapply varnish, which revealed the crucifix and the detail in the medallion worn by Dinteville.

== See also ==
- Artists of the Tudor court
- List of paintings by Hans Holbein the Younger
