= Saint Francis of Assisi, Saint Francis de Paul, and Saint Peter penitent =

17th Century anamorphic painting

- anamorphic painting of St. Francis of Assisi, St. Francis de Paul, and St. Peter
- Artist: Unknown
- Year: 16th or 17th century
- Medium: oil paint, wood
- Dimensions: 45 cm (18 in) × 36.5 cm (14.4 in) × 2.5 cm (0.98 in)
- Accession: 44784i

Saint Francis of Assisi, Saint Francis de Paul, and Saint Peter penitent is an anamorphic painting with three views, each showing the portrait of a different Christian saint: Saint Francis of Assisi, Saint Francis de Paul, and Saint Peter. Of the Spanish School style, and painted in either Naples or Spain in the 16th or 17th century, it is now in the collection of the Wellcome Library, London, having been purchased by Henry Wellcome in the early 20th century. The image seen by the viewer depends on their viewpoint, with different images appearing when they stand straight in front of the painting, or to the left or right.

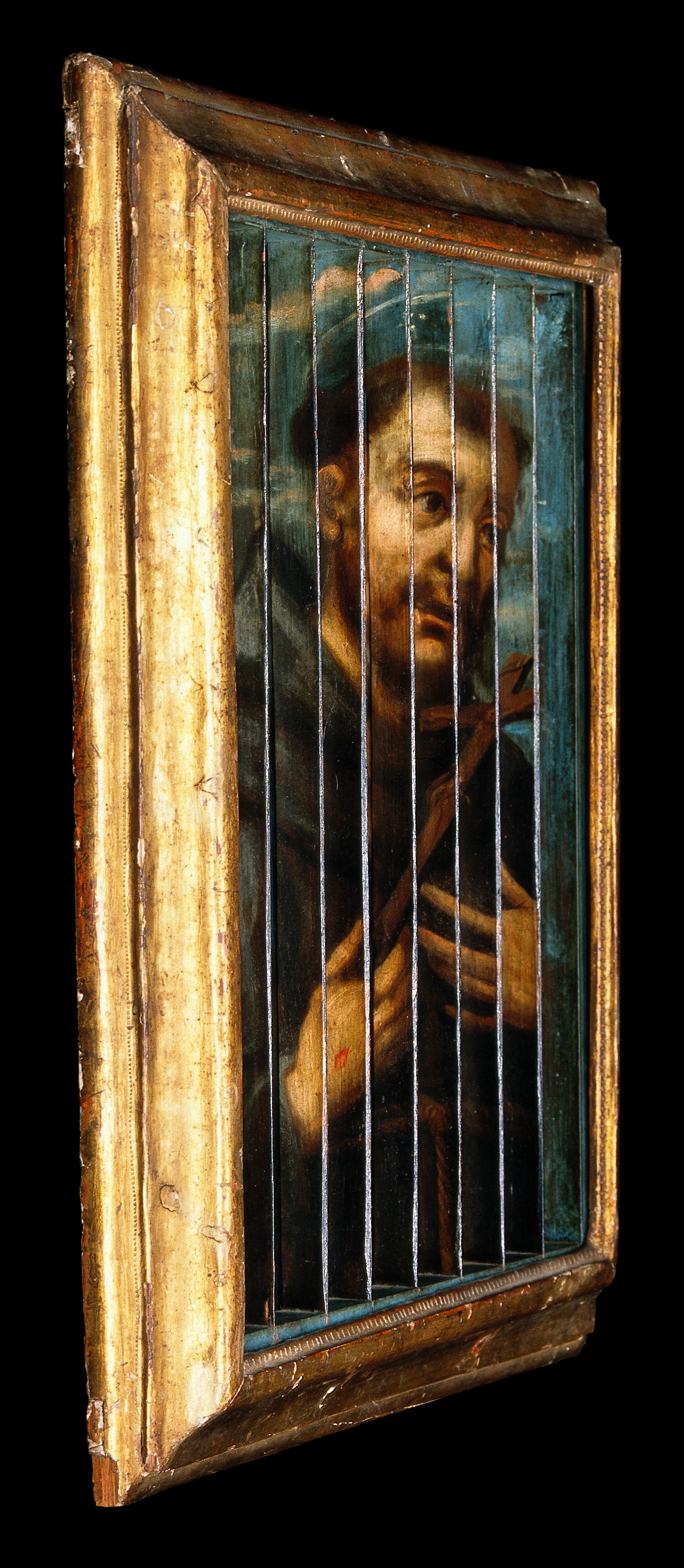
Francis of Assisi

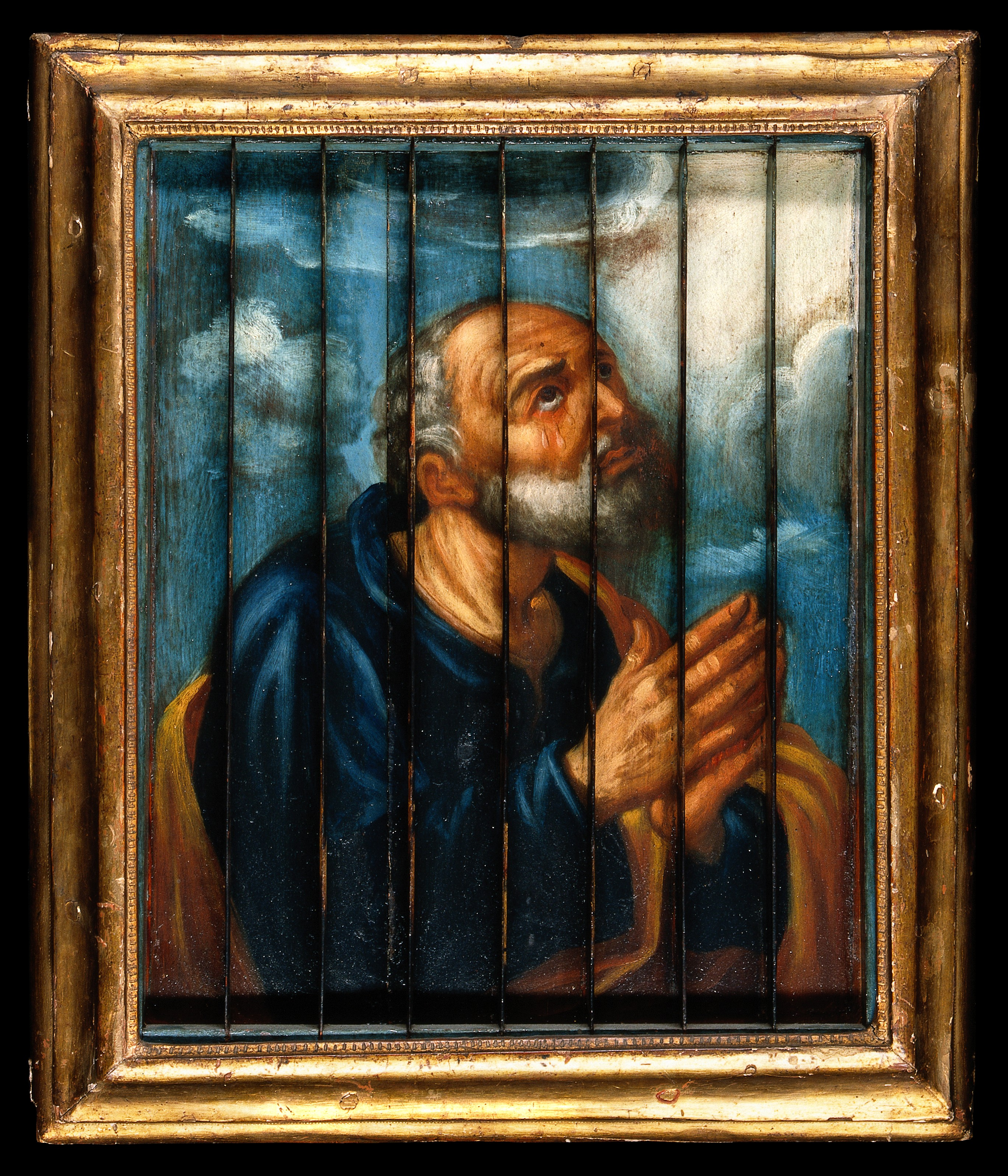
Saint Paul

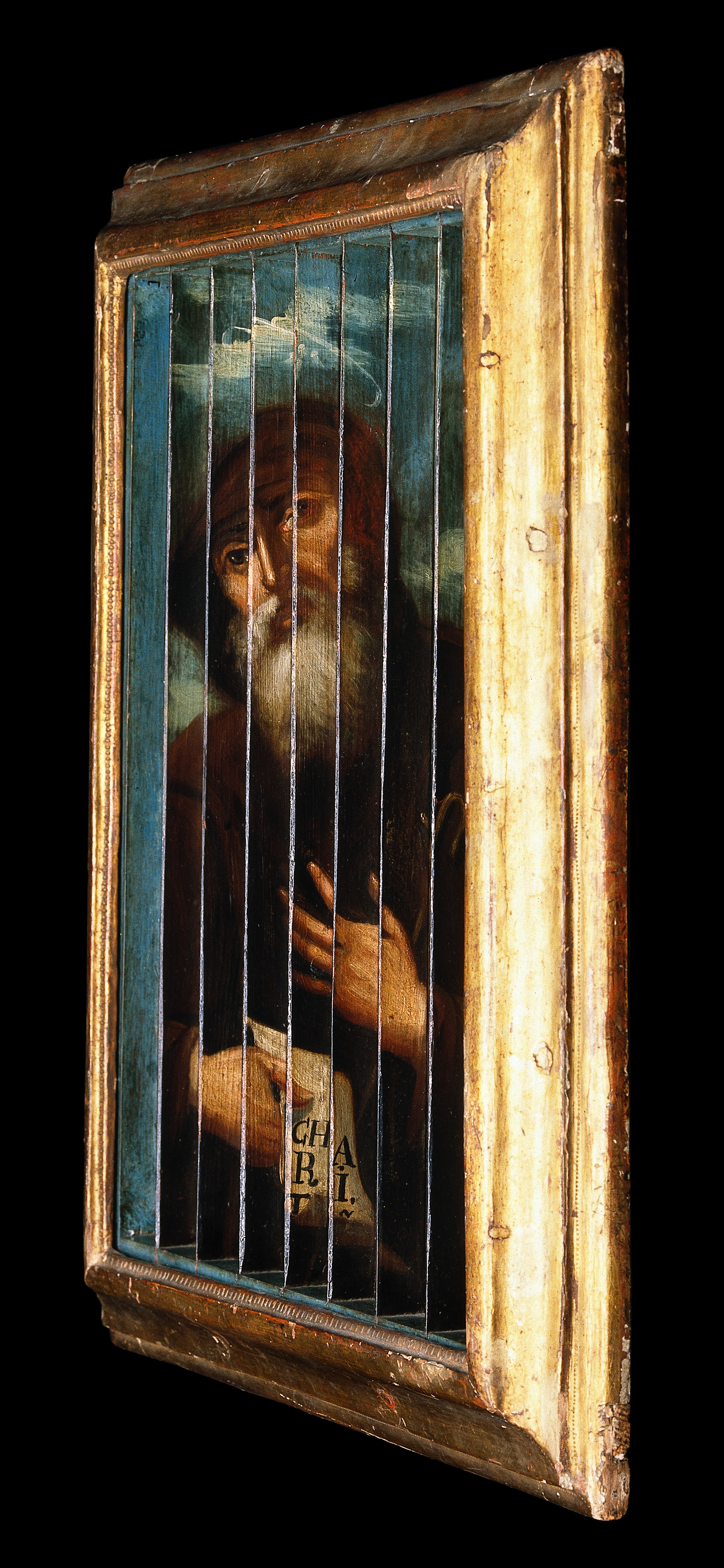
Francis of Paola

Seen when viewed from the left of the painting, St Francis is dressed in the habit of the order he founded and with the marks of stigmata mirroring the crucifix he holds in the same hand. Seen when viewed from the right is another St Francis – St Francis of Paola (St Francis de Paul) – wearing a cowl, and holding a paper marked CHARITAS. "Whilst the first two representations suggest [the central depiction] might be a third Saint Francis, the two teardrops falling from the figure's right eye – being a feature of many visual depictions of Saint Peter (who, according to the Gospels, burst into tears after denying Christ for the third time) – suggest that it is he, rather than another Saint Francis that is depicted here."

Anamorphic paintings (also known as "perspective" or "turning" pictures) with three views are known as "triscenorama". There are 7 "struts" of wood protruding from main board (by approximately 2.3 cm) on each side of which is painted a portion of the respective portrait. On the 8 gaps in between (of widths between 4.2 and 4.7 cm) is painted the third portrait.

== See also ==
- The Ambassadors (Holbein)
