= Jean de Dinteville =

French courtier and diplomat (1504–1555)

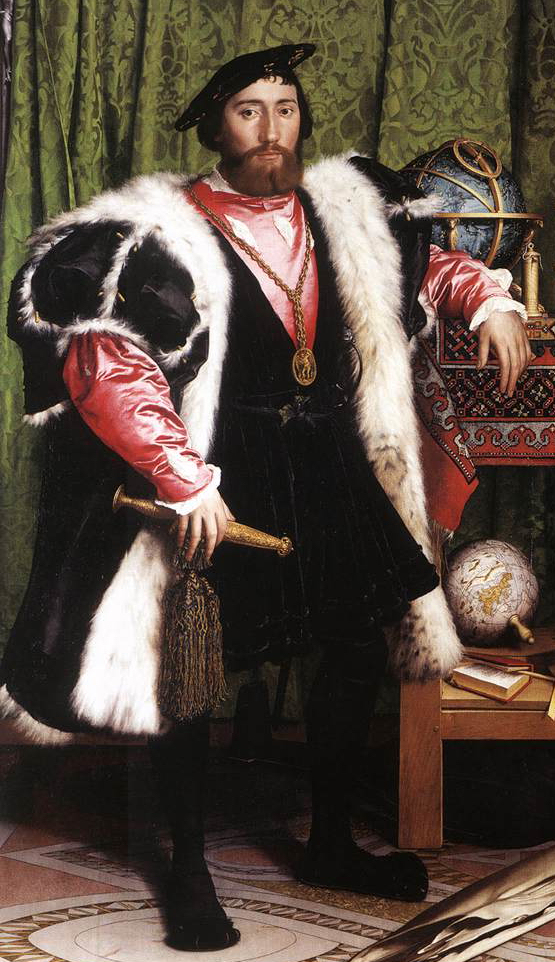
- Detail of Dinteville from Hans Holbein the Younger's The Ambassadors (1533)
- Born: 21 September 1504
- Died: 1555
- Occupations: Courtier, administrator and diplomat
- Known for: Sitter in Hans Holbein the Younger's The Ambassadors

Jean de Dinteville (21 September 1504 – 1555) was a French courtier, administrator and diplomat who served Francis I and members of the French royal family. As seigneur of Polisy and bailli of Troyes, he undertook five diplomatic missions to the court of Henry VIII of England between 1531 and 1537, a period encompassing Henry's marriage to Anne Boleyn and the developing English break with Rome. He later played an active part in the restoration to royal favour of the Dinteville family after a political crisis in the late 1530s.

Dinteville is best known as the figure on the left in Hans Holbein the Younger's 1533 double portrait Jean de Dinteville and Georges de Selve, commonly known as The Ambassadors. The painting, which Dinteville commissioned during his principal English embassy, was subsequently displayed at his family's château at Polisy.

== Family background and early life ==
Jean de Dinteville was born on 21 September 1504 to Gaucher de Dinteville and Anne du Plessis. The Dintevilles were an established noble family whose ancestry can be traced to the thirteenth century. Originally associated with the Jaucourt family, they took the Dinteville name from one of their lordships in Champagne and increased their wealth and standing through service to the dukes of Burgundy and Orléans and, subsequently, to the French crown.

Jean's paternal grandfather, Claude de Dinteville, served Charles the Bold, Duke of Burgundy, as surintendant des finances and was killed alongside him at the Battle of Nancy in 1477. Jean's father, Gaucher de Dinteville (1459–1531), served Louis XII and Francis I, acted as Francis I's lieutenant in Italy and was awarded the Order of Saint Michael. He married Anne du Plessis in 1496. She also came from a noble family with estates near Blois and brought additional property into the marriage. Jean was one of five surviving sons, several of whom pursued careers at court or in the church.

Jean entered the royal household in 1524 as an échanson, or cupbearer, to the royal children. This office placed him in personal service to members of the royal family.

By 1527 Dinteville had succeeded his father as bailli of Troyes and was appointed governor of Bar-sur-Seine. In 1531 he became a royal gentilhomme and was attached particularly to the household of Francis I's youngest son, Charles, Duke of Angoulême, later Duke of Orléans.

On his father's death in 1531, Dinteville succeeded to the lordship of Polisy. He may also have succeeded his father as a member of the Order of Saint Michael, whose insignia he wears in Holbein's portrait, although modern scholarship treats his formal membership as uncertain.

== Diplomatic missions to England ==
Dinteville was sent to England on five occasions, in 1531, 1533, 1535, 1536 and 1537. His repeated employment there placed him at the intersection of French diplomacy, Henry VIII's dynastic and religious policies, and relations between the English crown and the papacy.

His first mission, in the autumn of 1531, was comparatively brief; he left England on 3 December. His most important posting began in January 1533. The principal diplomatic issue confronting him was Henry VIII's intended marriage to Anne Boleyn and its implications for Anglo-French relations. Dinteville remained in England during Anne's coronation in June and the birth of the future Elizabeth I in September.

His surviving correspondence from London records both diplomatic business and more personal concerns. In May 1533 he reported suffering from fièvre tierce, or tertian fever, identified by Foister as malaria. His letters also reveal his increasing impatience with his prolonged stay in England.

During this embassy Dinteville was visited by his friend Georges de Selve, Bishop of Lavaur. Two surviving letters written by Dinteville to his brother François record de Selve's visit and Dinteville's pleasure at seeing him. The visit provided the occasion for Holbein's double portrait of the two men.

Dinteville returned to England in September 1535. His mission was connected with the diplomatic consequences of Henry VIII's executions of Thomas More and John Fisher and Pope Paul III's response to them. He undertook another mission in April 1536.

His fifth and final mission occurred in 1537. Francis I sent Dinteville to warn Henry VIII about the papal legation of Cardinal Reginald Pole, who had been charged with encouraging opposition to Henry and seeking his return to obedience to Rome.

== The Ambassadors ==
During his 1533 embassy, Dinteville commissioned Hans Holbein the Younger to paint the large double portrait now known as The Ambassadors. Dinteville, aged 29 according to the inscription on his dagger, stands on the left, and his friend Georges de Selve, aged 25, on the right. Between them Holbein depicted globes, mathematical and astronomical instruments, books and musical objects, while an anamorphic skull occupies the foreground.

The objects in the painting have generated extensive scholarly discussion concerning religion, diplomacy, learning and the political circumstances of 1533. They should not, however, all be treated as direct evidence of Dinteville's personal accomplishments or interests. His correspondence does independently show curiosity about at least one scientific instrument: in May 1533 he asked his brother to send him a drawing of a compass whose construction he was attempting to understand.

The painting was eventually taken to Polisy, probably when Dinteville returned from his 1533 embassy, although he later made three further journeys to England. It is first securely recorded in an inventory of the château dated 21–24 January 1589, where it hung in the great hall.

== Dinteville family crisis and Italian exile ==
The family's position at the French court deteriorated sharply during the later 1530s. In 1536 Jean's brother Guillaume was accused of involvement in the poisoning of Francis I's eldest son, the dauphin François, but was cleared.

A more serious crisis followed in 1538, when another brother, Gaucher, was accused of sodomy. Gaucher fled France and sought refuge in Venice. After he failed to return to face proceedings, Francis I declared him in default in January 1539; his property was confiscated and his effigy was publicly burned. Guillaume and François II subsequently joined him in Italy.

The exile was neither brief nor entirely voluntary. Francis I attempted to prevent the brothers from obtaining secure refuge, and several Italian rulers were pressed not to receive them. During approximately three years away from France, the brothers moved among such places as Venice, Bologna and Naples. François II also lost effective control of his bishopric of Auxerre.

Jean's position differed significantly from that of his brothers. He did not accompany them into Italian exile, but remained in France, apparently spending considerable time at Polisy.

By the spring of 1542 Jean had been readmitted to the household of Prince Charles and made overtures to Francis I seeking the family's reconciliation with the crown. Guillaume and Gaucher's military service in Italy also helped prepare the way for their return. In May 1542 Francis I visited the Dinteville château at Polisy, marking a major stage in the family's political rehabilitation. When François II subsequently sought restoration of his position, Jean negotiated the terms of a compromise on his brother's behalf.

The restoration was nevertheless gradual rather than complete. Disputes involving François II and the bishopric of Auxerre continued for years, and full legal restitution was not achieved until 1551 under Henri II.

== Moses and Aaron before Pharaoh ==
The Dinteville family's experience of disgrace and exile has been connected with the large allegorical painting Moses and Aaron before Pharaoh: An Allegory of the Dinteville Family, now in the Metropolitan Museum of Art. The work depicts the four Dinteville brothers as figures in the biblical confrontation with Pharaoh: Jean is represented as Moses and François II as Aaron.

The painter is unknown. The Metropolitan Museum attributes the work to the conventional Master of the Dinteville Allegory. More recent scholarship has suggested that the unidentified artist was probably Netherlandish and may have been Bartholomeus Pons, although that attribution remains uncertain.

The work bears repeated references to the year 1537, and the Metropolitan Museum dates it accordingly. Brown has argued, however, that it may instead have been commissioned around 1539, after François, Guillaume and Gaucher had gone into Italian exile. On this interpretation, the references to 1537 recall the last period before the family's fall from royal favour rather than necessarily recording the date of the painting's execution.

Brown has interpreted the biblical imagery as an allegory of the family's political circumstances. The exiled Dintevilles are associated with the captive Israelites awaiting deliverance, whereas Jean, who remained in France, appears as Moses. In Brown's interpretation, the painting functioned not only as a family portrait but as an allegorical statement about persecution, exile and hoped-for restoration.

== Return to royal service and Polisy ==
Following the family's reconciliation with the crown, Dinteville resumed royal service. He returned to the household of Charles, Duke of Orléans, in 1542 and in 1549 was appointed gentilhomme ordinaire of the chamber of Henri II, an office in the king's household.

During these years, Polisy became an increasingly important focus of Dinteville's activity. He undertook substantial rebuilding of the family's older residence, with construction under way by the mid-1540s.

Francesco Primaticcio, who worked at Fontainebleau and maintained connections with the Dinteville family, was at Polisy in December 1544. Domenico del Barbiere was also associated with the documentary record of that visit. Although both artists have subsequently been connected with the renovation of the château, their involvement in the building work remains uncertain.

Decorative work commissioned for Polisy included an elaborate tiled pavement dating from the 1540s. The château also became the setting for major works associated with the family, including The Ambassadors and Moses and Aaron before Pharaoh. The 1589 inventory records both paintings at Polisy.

Dinteville and his brothers were also associated with broader artistic patronage. An elaborately illuminated manuscript now in the Bibliothèque nationale de France, Latin 1429, was originally produced for a member of the Dinteville family after its return to royal favour in 1542 and was later altered for presentation to Henri II. The identity of the original Dinteville commissioner is uncertain, and the manuscript cannot securely be attributed to Jean personally.

== Illness and final years ==
Dinteville's health deteriorated during the later years of his life. Documents mention illness as early as 1542, while later family evidence associates the onset of his severe paralysing condition with about 1546.

The surviving sources describe the effects of the illness but do not identify its medical cause. A younger relative, Jean de Mergey, later remembered Dinteville as paralytique et impotent de tous ses membres—paralysed and deprived of the use of his limbs. Royal documents similarly refer to his weakness, debility and inability to attend court.

Nevertheless, his illness did not immediately end his royal standing. Despite his increasing disability, Dinteville was appointed to Henri II's chamber in 1549.

Jean de Mergey, a younger relative who spent time at Polisy, later described Dinteville as occupying himself with the construction of the château after illness prevented his continued attendance at court. Dinteville's building and artistic activities at Polisy therefore continued during at least part of his physical decline.

His connections with court artists also persisted. At some point in 1551 or 1552, Primaticcio wrote to François II de Dinteville that he intended to make another likeness of Jean for the Duke of Guise, showing that portraits of Dinteville were still being requested during his final years.

By 1552 Dinteville was reported to be unable to leave his home. He died unmarried in 1555. A seventeenth-century family account records that he was buried in the church at Polisy.

== Portraits and legacy ==
Dinteville's modern reputation rests principally on Holbein's The Ambassadors, now in the National Gallery in London, which has become one of the best-known portraits of the Northern Renaissance and has generated extensive scholarship concerning its political, religious and scientific imagery.

The few other surviving or documented likenesses provide a broader visual record of Dinteville. A chalk portrait by Jean Clouet is preserved at the Musée Condé at Chantilly. Dinteville also appears as Moses in Moses and Aaron before Pharaoh. At least one further portrait or drawing was planned by Primaticcio late in Dinteville's life, although the identification of some paintings traditionally claimed to represent him remains disputed.

Although remembered chiefly as the principal sitter in Holbein's painting, surviving diplomatic correspondence and modern scholarship document a substantially wider career. Dinteville served successive members of the French royal family, administered royal authority in Champagne and undertook repeated missions to Henry VIII's court during a decisive period of the English Reformation. He remained in France during his brothers' exile, played an active part in the family's return to royal favour, and continued his architectural and artistic activities at Polisy despite severe illness in his later years.
