= Shepherd's dial =

Type of sundial

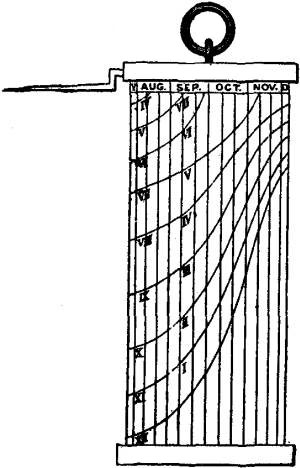
A typical shepherd's staff, with a gnomon that produces a shadow on a scale of months.

A shepherd's dial (also known as a pillar dial or cylinder) is a type of sundial that measures the height of the sun via the so-called umbra versa. Its design needs to incorporate a fixed latitude, but it is small and portable. It is named after Pyrenean shepherds, who would trace such a sundial on their staffs. This type of sundial was very popular in the 16th, 17th, and 18th centuries.

== History ==
Since the ancient Roman era, people have created sundials which tell the time by measuring differences in the sun's height above the horizon over the course of the day – Vitruvius describes them as viatoria pensilia. The earliest description of a shepherd's dial as known today was written by Hermann of Reichenau, an 11th-century Benedictine monk, who called it a cylindrus horarius. It was also known in the Middle Ages as a chilinder oxoniensis (Oxford cylinder). Such sundials did not need aligning north-south and so became very popular, appearing in Renaissance artworks such as Holbein's 1528 Portrait of Nicolaus Kratzer and his 1533 The Ambassadors.

== Variants ==
A Slovenian shepherd's dial is a flat dial in the shape of a sector of a circle. It is hung vertically and measures the altitude of the sun. A movable peg adjusts for the changing seasons.
