= Georges de Selve =

French bishop and diplomat (1508–1541)

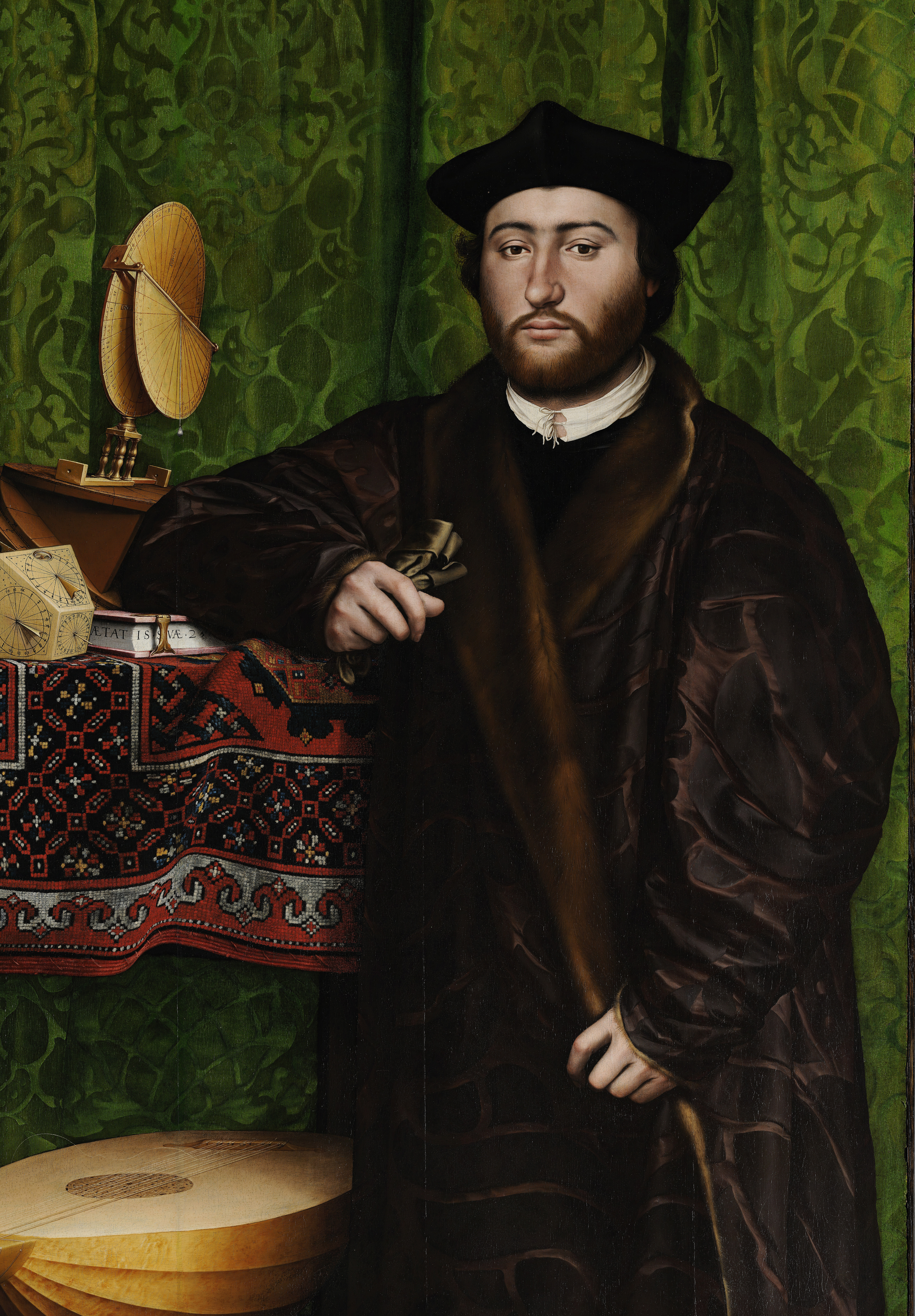
- George de Selve in Hans Holbein the Younger's The Ambassadors.

Bishop of Lavaur
- In office 1526–1540

Ambassador to Republic of Venice, Austria, the Pope, England, Germany and Spain
- In office April 1540 – 12 April 1541
- Monarch: King Francis I of France

Personal details
- Born: 1508
- Died: April 12, 1541 (aged 32–33)
- Parent: Jean de Selve (father)
- Relatives: Odet de Selve
- Occupation: Scholar, diplomat and ecclesiastic

Georges de Selve (1508 – 12 April 1541) was a French scholar, diplomat and ecclesiastic.

== Biography ==
He was the son of Jean de Selve, a jurist and Parlement president, and brother of Odet de Selve. Three other brothers served as diplomats.

Georges de Selve was Bishop of Lavaur from 1526 (at age 18) to 1540. He was sent by King Francis I of France as ambassador to the Republic of Venice, Austria (in April 1540), to the Pope in Rome, to England, Germany and Spain.

He is the figure of the right in a picture by Hans Holbein the Younger, The Ambassadors, and Jean de Dinteville is the other one, which hangs in the National Gallery, London. De Selve was just 25 when Holbein painted him and he is wearing the vestments of a clergyman, who represents the interests of the Catholic Church, since he had just been appointed Bishop of Lavaur in France.

He wrote on theology, studied with and was a patron of Eli Levita from 1534, and was commissioned by the king to make translations.

He died on 12 April 1541 at the age of 33 and is interred at Lavaur Cathedral.

== Bibliography ==
- Robert J. Kalas, The Selve Family of Limousin: Members of a New Elite in Early Modern France, The Sixteenth Century Journal, 18 (1987), 147-172
