= Jean de Dieu-Raymond de Cucé de Boisgelin =

French prelate, statesman and cardinal

His Eminence Jean de Dieu-Raymond de Cucé de Boisgelin
- Archbishop of Tours
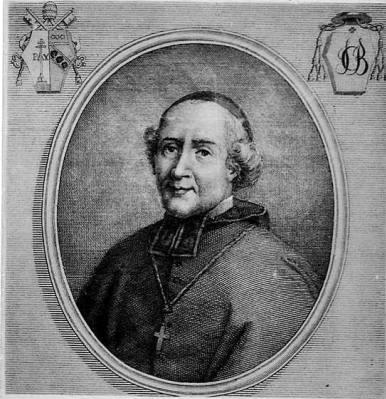
- Church: Roman Catholic Church
- Archdiocese: Tours
- See: Tours
- Appointed: 16 April 1802
- Installed: 17 July 1802
- Term ended: 22 August 1804
- Predecessor: Joachim François Mamert de Conzié
- Successor: Louis-Mathias de Barral
- Previous posts: Bishop of Lavaur (1765-71); Archbishop of Aix (1771–1801)

Orders
- Ordination: c. 1755
- Consecration: 28 April 1765 by Etienne-Charles de Loménie de Brienne
- Created cardinal: 17 January 1803 by Pope Pius VII
- Rank: Cardinal-Priest

Personal details
- Born: Jean de Dieu-Raymond de Cucé de Boisgelin; 27 February 1732 Rennes, Kingdom of France
- Died: 22 August 1804 (aged 72) Angervilliers, First French Empire
- Parents: Renaud Gabriel de Boisgelin de Cucé; Jeanne Françoise Marie du Roscoët
- Education: Sorbonne University
- Coat of arms

Jean de Dieu-Raymond de Cucé de Boisgelin (27 February 1732 – 22 August 1804) was a French prelate, statesman and cardinal. The Boisgelin of Cucé are the Cadet branch of the maison de Boisgelin). His cousin is the famous author Louis de Boisgelin.

== Biography ==
Boisgelin was born in Rennes. Achieving remarkable success in his studies at the seminary of Saint-Sulpice and the Sorbonne, the death of his elder brother made him the head of his family, and giving up his birthright, he dedicated his life to the Catholic Church. He rose rapidly through the hierarchy of the church, first made Vicar-General of Pontoise; then in 1765 he was created Bishop of Lavaur; and on 4 November 1770 he was appointed Archbishop of Aix in Provence. Boisgelin also had the honour of delivering the funeral orations of both of the future king Louis XVI's parents, the Dauphin in 1765, and the Dauphine in 1767.

As Archbishop of Aix he won for himself the name of skillful administrator and princely benefactor. Provence owes to him the digging of a canal bearing his name, several works of public utility, such as a bridge at Lavaur and educational institutions for poor children. When in a time of scarcity and of political ferment, at the outset of the French Revolution, Aix was threatened with violence and famine, the archbishop by his firmness, great ascendancy, wisdom, and generosity, proved its savior. The mob had pillaged the public granaries, and had answered by insults the summons of authority; as president of the Estates of Provence, Boisgelin assembled the magistrates, chief citizens, and merchants, dispelled their fears, and prevailed upon these men to procure for Aix an abundant supply of grain, towards the payment of which he contributed one hundred thousand livres. He issued a pastoral letter to his clergy, asking them to urge the people to restore to the granaries the grain they had carried. away. The people obeyed and, flocking to the cathedral, expressed their gratitude to the archbishop who was so absolutely devoted to their welfare.

At the coronation of Louis XVI he delivered an address demanding relief for the impoverished. In 1776, he was elected to the Académie Française. He was appointed in 1787 member of the Assembly of notables.

== French Revolution ==
Boisgelin was elected to represent the higher clergy of his province at the States-General, in 1789 by the sénéchaussée of Aix. His practical political wisdom and moderation appeared on many occasions; he voted, in the name of the clergy, for the union of the three orders, the abolition of feudal rights, and offered 400,000 livres to the public treasury; but he opposed the abolition of tithes and the confiscation of church property. His political sagacity and oratory made him the recognized leader and spokesman of thirty bishops, his colleagues in the Assembly, where he advocated for liberty and religion, and for full participation of the citizenry in the government, with political rights as indestructible as natural and civic rights. He served as one of the earlier presidents of the National Assembly (23 November – 4 December 1789).

The majority of the assembly voted for the Civil Constitution of the Clergy. It denied the supreme jurisdiction of the pope, subjected ecclesiastics to the civil power, and decreed that all the members of the clergy, beginning with those in the assembly, should take the oath of allegiance to the constitution, under penalty of exile and the forfeiture of their salaries. Boisgelin rose to champion the cause of the Church: "Let the law", he exclaimed in the assembly, "leave us our honor and liberty; take back your salaries." It was he who wrote the famous "Exposition of Principles", signed by all except four of the bishops of France, condemning the civil constitution; it was he who in the name of his colleagues corresponded during two years with Rome; he who in a letter, dated 3 May 1791, proposed to the bishops to lay their resignations at the feet of Pius VI; in 1801 he effectively made to Pope Pius VII the sacrifice not accepted by Pope Pius VI.

== In exile ==
When persecutions drove him out of France he went to England. In his answer to a letter from Edmund Burke in which the orator expressed his admiration for the spirit of disinterestedness and dignity of character of the French episcopacy, he complained that he was expelled from France in the name of that liberty he had in perfect faith contributed to establish, and under whose protection he hoped to end his days.

Boisgelin returned to France when Napoleon restored peace to the Church and to France by his Concordat, 15 July 1801. In 1802, he was raised to the archiepiscopal See of Tours and soon after created cardinal.

== Works ==
In 1776 he was chosen member of the Académie Française. His works include:

- Collection de diverses pièces en vers (1783)
- L'art de juger d'après l'analogie des idées (1789)
- Considérations sur la paix publique adressées de la Révolution (1791)
- Exposition des principes sur la constitution du clergé (1791)
- Le Psalmiste, traduction des Psaumes en vers (1799)
- Traduction des Héroïdes d'Ovide (1784)

His complete works appeared in Paris, 1818.
