= Charles François d'Abra de Raconis =

French bishop and theologian

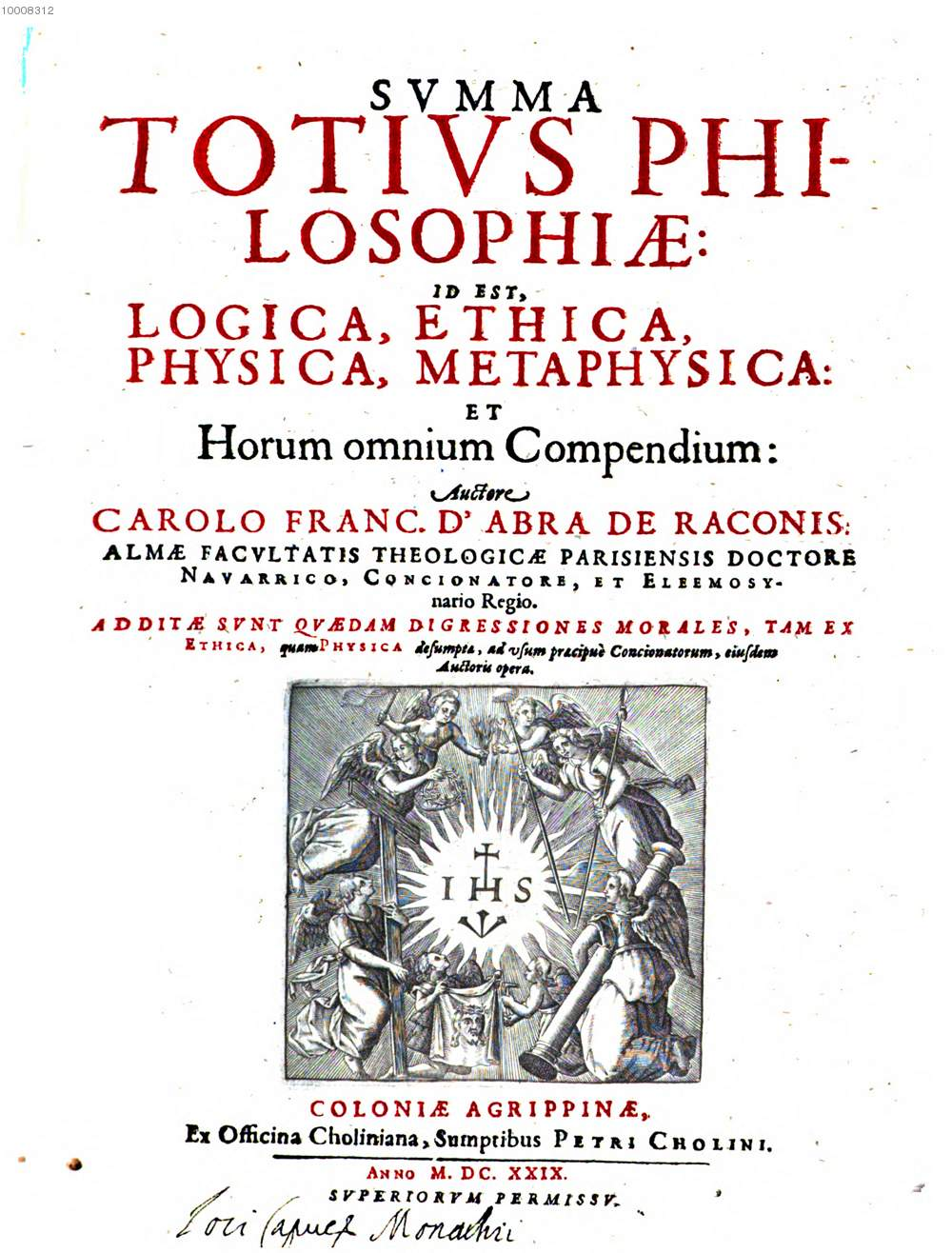
Metaphysica (Paris, 1624).

Charles François d'Abra de Raconis (1580–1646) was a French bishop and theologian.

== Life ==
Born at Château de Raconis in 1580 of a Calvinistic family, he died in 1646. In 1592, his family was converted to the Catholic faith. He taught philosophy at the Collège du Plessis in 1609, theology at the Collège de Navarre in 1615, and three years later was appointed court preacher and royal almoner. At this epoch he took part in religious polemics and wrote works of controversy, anti-Calvinist and anti-Jansenist pamphlets. In 1637, he was appointed Bishop of Lavaur, but was not consecrated until 1639. In 1643 he was back in Paris, and controversies with the Jansenists engaged him until his death.

== Works ==
He is the author of original treatises of metaphysics, which Descartes would later read. His Summa totius philosophiae was published in 1617 and later developed in the Metaphysica seu prima ac suprema scientia (Paris, 1624).

== Controversy ==
Saint Vincent de Paul spurred him on and encouraged him. Two years before his death he published his "Examen et jugement du livre de la fréquente communion fait contre la fréquente communion et publié sous le nom du sieur Arnauld" (Paris, 1644). The following year he published a rejoinder to the reply to this. Antoine Arnauld affected great contempt for him, and declared that his works were "despised by all respectable persons." Raconis also wrote against the heresy of "two heads of the Church Saints Peter and Paul," formulated by Martin de Barcos. The bishop's "Primauté et Souveraineté singulière de Saint Pierre" (1645) roused the wrath of his opponents.

Towards 1645, the report was circulated in Paris that he had written to the Pope, denouncing the dangerous teachings in the "Fréquente Communion", and telling the Pope that some French bishops tolerated and approved of these impieties. The Bishop of Grasse informed a general assembly of the clergy of this fact. This aroused their animosity, all the more since some of them had recommended Arnauld's work. They entered a complaint with the Nuncio, and then compelled Raconis to say whether he had written the letter or not. Although he denied having done so, they drew up a common protestation against the accusations of which they were the objects and sent it to Innocent X.
