= Charles Le Goux de La Berchère =

French prelate

- Archbishop of Narbonne
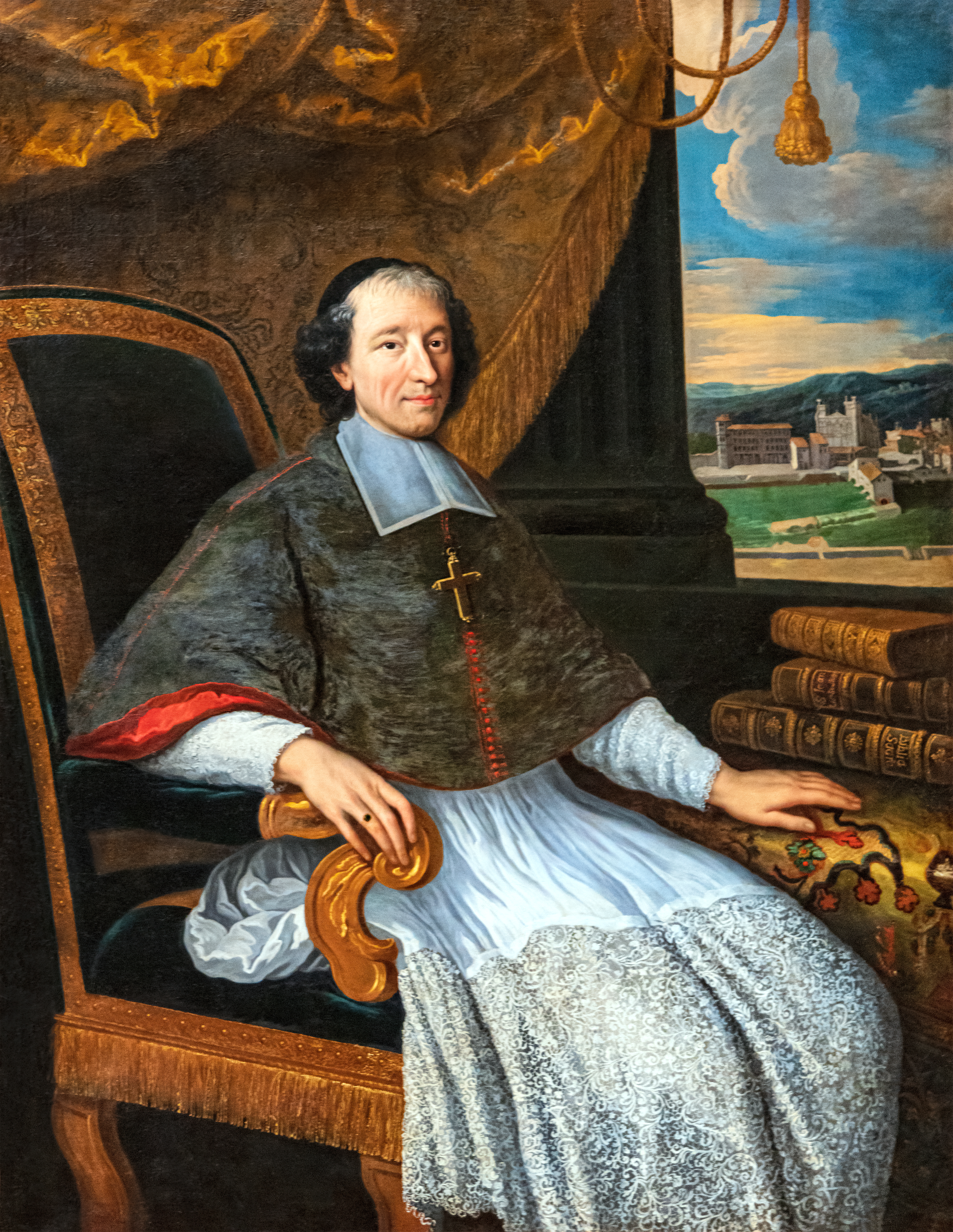
- Church: Catholic Church
- Archdiocese: Archdiocese of Narbonne
- In office: 12 November 1703 – 2 June 1719
- Predecessor: Piero de Bonzi
- Successor: René François de Beauvau du Rivau
- Previous posts: Archbishop of Albi (1693-1703); Archbishop of Aix (1685-1693); Bishop of Lavaur (1677-1685)

Orders
- Consecration: 12 April 1678 by François de Harlay de Champvallon

Personal details
- Born: 23 October 1647 Dauphiné, Kingdom of France
- Died: 2 June 1719 (aged 71) Narbonne, Kingdom of France

Charles Le Goux de La Berchère (23 October 1647 – 2 June 1719) was a French prelate. He served successively as Bishop of Lavaur (1677–1685), Archbishop of Aix (1685–1687), Archbishop of Albi (1687–1703) and Archbishop of Narbonne (1703–1719).
