= Portrait of Nicolaus Kratzer =

Painting by Hans Holbein the Younger

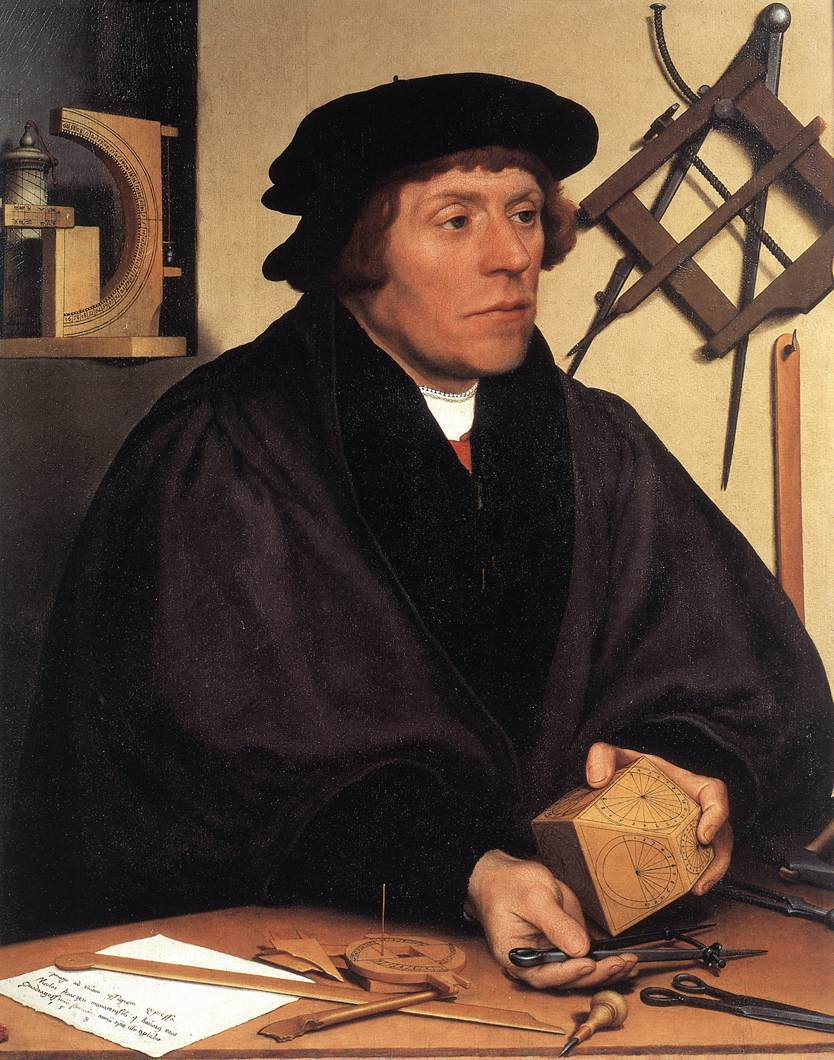
- Artist: Hans Holbein the Younger
- Year: 1528
- Medium: tempera on oak
- Dimensions: 83 cm × 67 cm (33 in × 26 in)
- Location: Louvre, Paris
- Accession: 1343; MR 751
- Website: collections.louvre.fr

Portrait of Nicolaus Kratzer is a 1528 half-length portrait by Hans Holbein the Younger. It is now in the Louvre, whilst a copy after it hangs in the National Portrait Gallery. It shows the astronomer Nikolaus Kratzer, a friend of Thomas More and Holbein himself. In his hand he holds a half-finished polyhedral sundial, whilst on the shelves behind him are a semi-circular star quadrant, a shepherd's dial and other instruments.

== See also ==
- List of paintings by Hans Holbein the Younger
