= Nicholas Kratzer =

German mathmetician

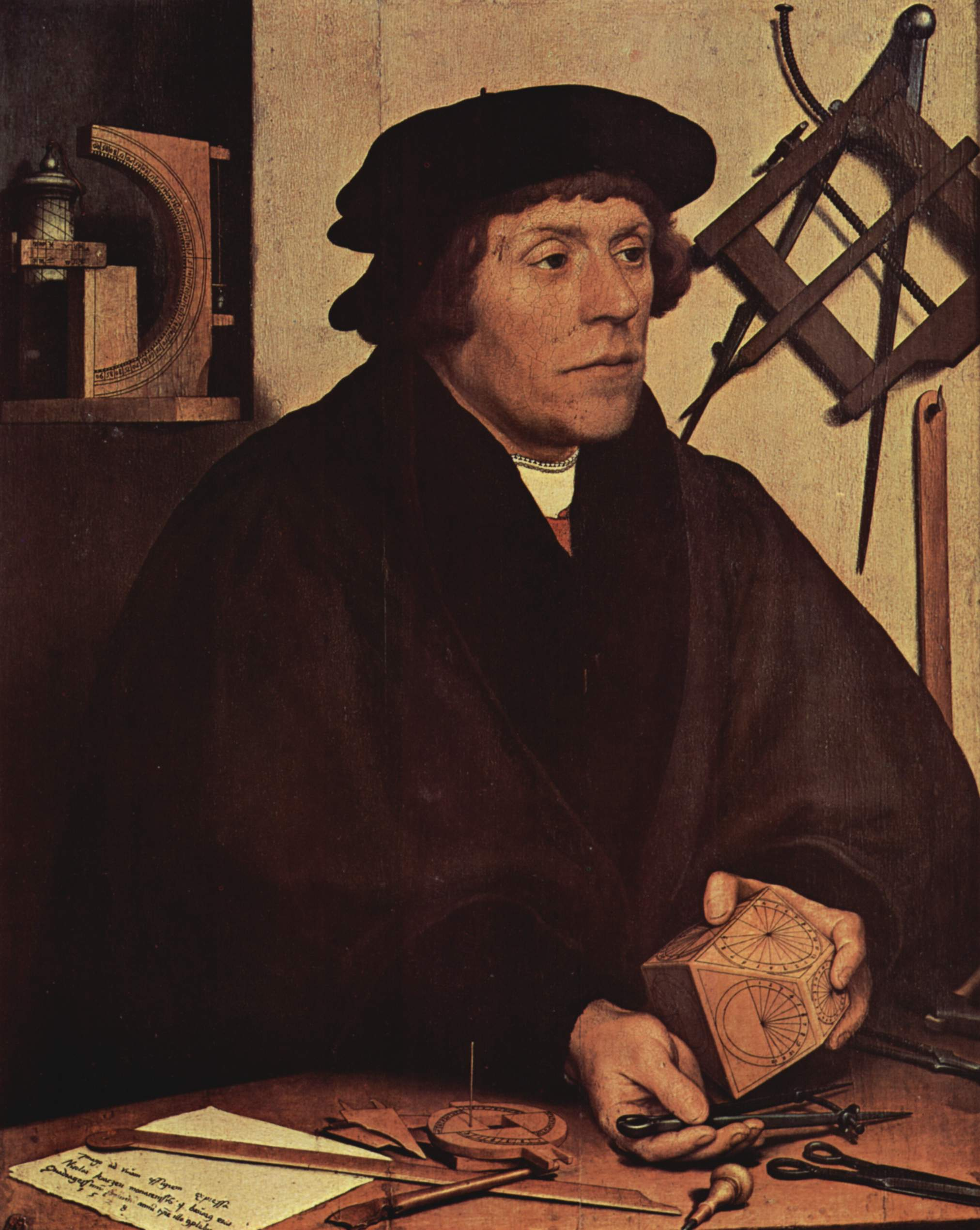
- Nicholas Kratzer, 1528 painting by Hans Holbein the Younger
- Born: 1487? Munich
- Died: 1550
- Occupations: Mathematician; Astronomer; Horologist

Nicholas Kratzer (1487? – 1550), also known as Nicolaus Kratzer and Nicholas Crutcher, was a German mathematician, astronomer, and horologist. Much of Kratzer's professional life was spent in England, where he was appointed as astronomer to King Henry VIII.

== Life ==
Born in Munich in 1486 or 1487, Kratzer was the son of a saw-smith, and was educated at the Universities of Cologne (B.A. 1509) and Wittenberg. He came to England in 1516 and established himself as part of the artistic and scientific circle around Sir Thomas More. Kratzer tutored More's children in mathematics and astronomy and More introduced him at court in much the same way as he had their mutual friend Hans Holbein, who produced a portrait of Kratzer. In the same manner as Holbein, Kratzer's talents obtained him a court position as astronomer and clock maker to the king.

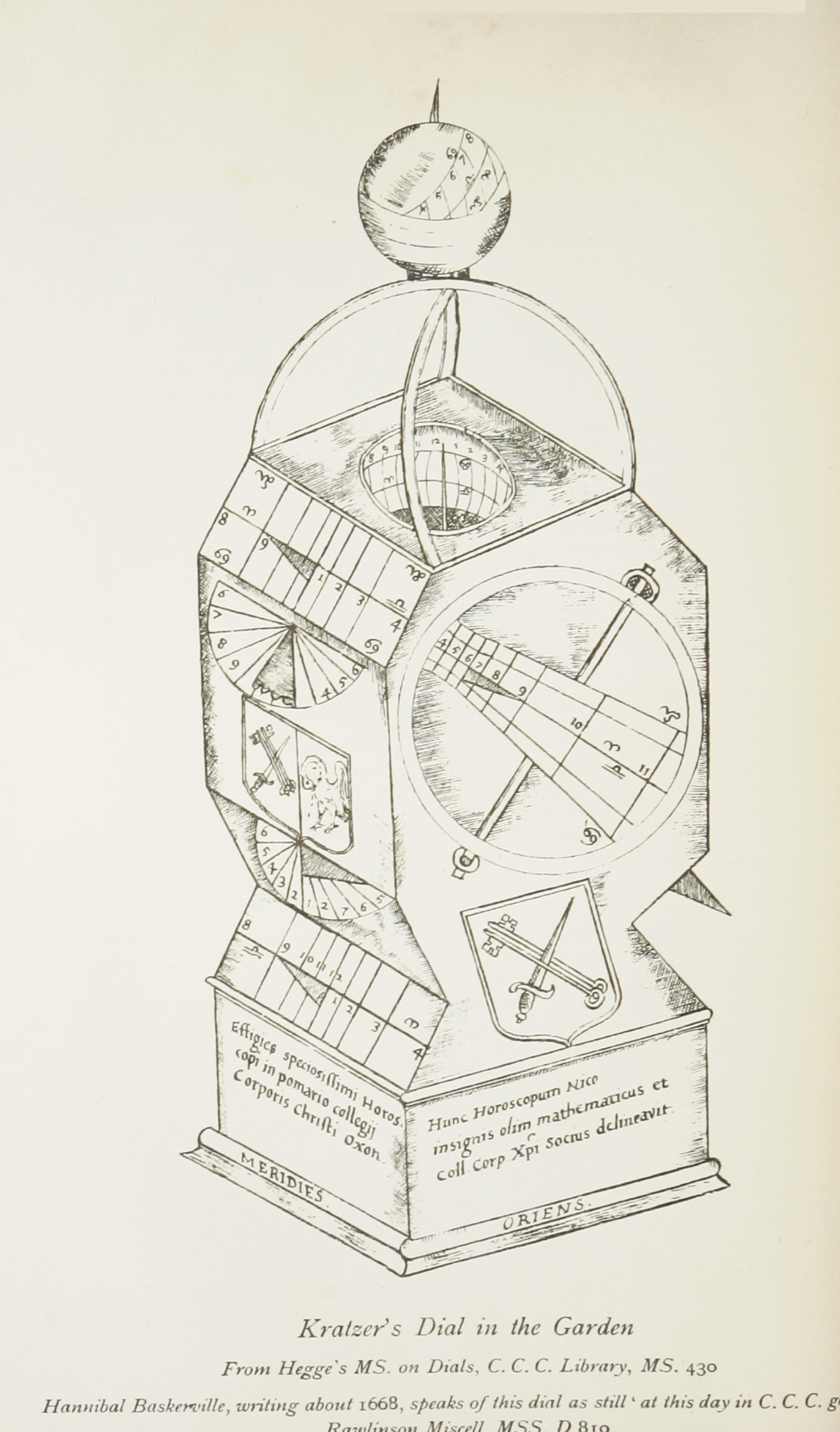
Sundial by Kratzer, formerly in the garden of Corpus Christi College, Oxford.

Kratzer was the designer of a painted ceiling featuring the zodiac and the seven planets which was installed in a temporary banqueting house erected at Greenwich Palace in March 1527. According to accounts kept by Richard Gibson, an officer of the revels, "Master Nikolas" worked with the painter "Master Hans", Hans Holbein, and was paid 4 shillings a day.

Kratzer also collaborated with Holbein on producing maps, and in return the artist produced a portrait of Kratzer in 1528 that now hangs in the Louvre; it depicts the craftsman surrounded by the tools of his trade, and with an unfinished polyhedral sundial. His close relationship with Holbein and More also may be observed in his annotations of Holbein's draft for his portrait of the More family. Kratzer identifies the various family members and their ages for the benefit of More's friend, the theologian Erasmus.

Kratzer (under the name Nich. Cratcherus) is recorded as a reader of Corpus Christi College, Oxford, where he is presumed to have taught mathematics. He designed at least two fixed sundials in Oxford, both of which are now lost. One was in St Mary's churchyard, the other in the garden of Corpus Christi. He also designed a portable dial for Cardinal Wolsey, which is now in the History of Science Museum, Oxford. Another dial attributed to Kratzer was found at Acton Court, near Bristol, in the 1980s.

Peter Drinkwater has presented a critical evaluation of the sundials attributed to Kratzer, in particular the one in the Holbein portrait. He comments that "Kratzer triumphed, not through genius or creativity, but through having learned what others had discovered and invented, and by being the first to apply that learning in England". John North concurs: "Kratzer doubtless had nothing new to offer of a fundamental kind. Many of his dials were unusual, but his favorite polyhedral dial was perhaps more useful as a repository of verses [...] than for actually announcing the time with any accuracy". Nonetheless, Kratzer brought useful German skills and knowledge to the English court and was well-regarded over a period of nearly 30 years.
