= Ancient Diocese of Lavaur =

Roman Catholic diocese in France (1317–1801)

Coordinates: 43.6993°N 1.8213°E

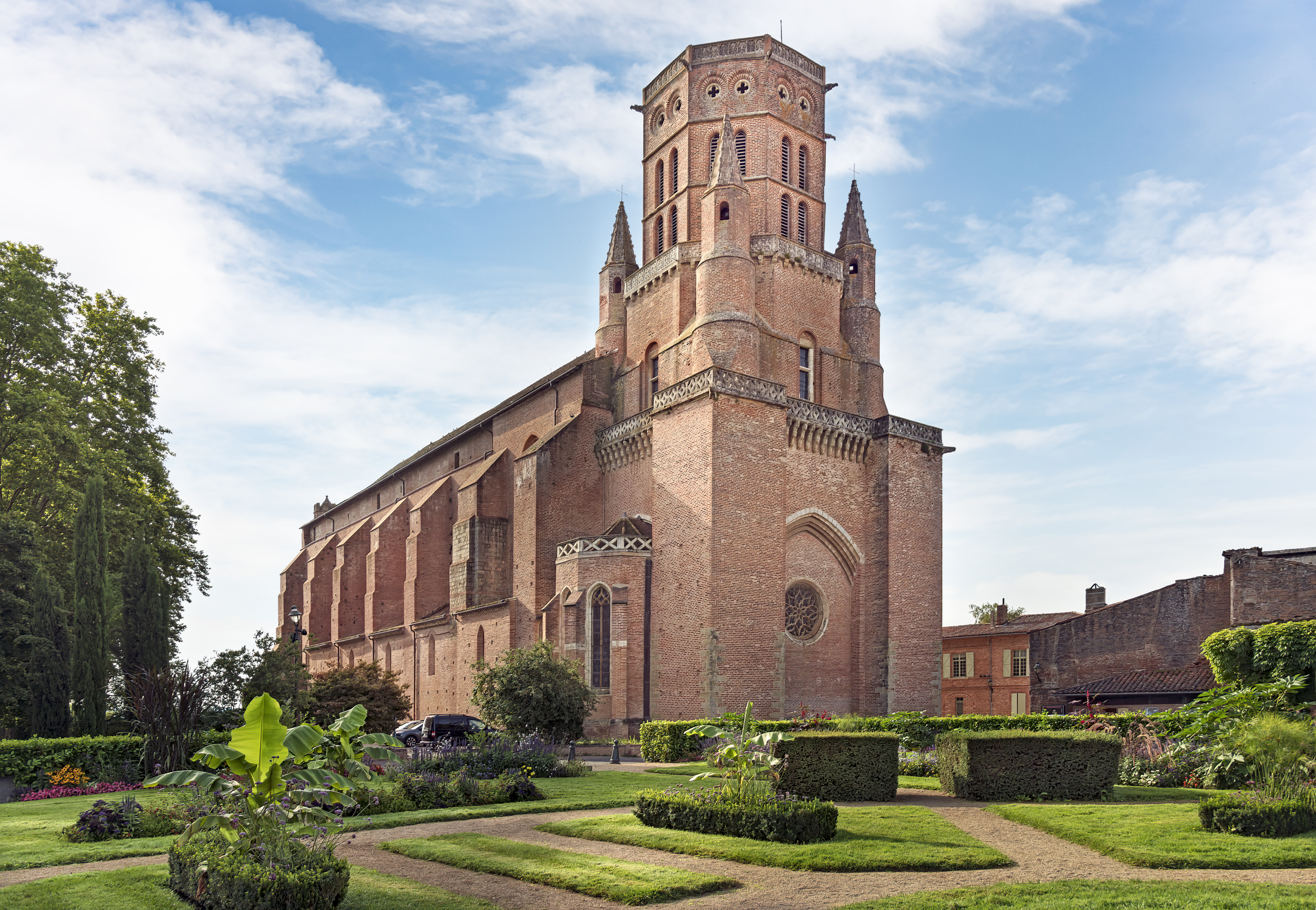
Lavaur Cathedral

The bishopric of Lavaur (Tarn, France) (in Latin: dioecesis Vaurensis) was founded by Pope John XXII in his plan to reorganize the sprawling diocese of Toulouse. The town is situated some fifteen miles to the east of Toulouse. Lavaur had the reputation of being one of the strongest centers of Catharism, being referred to as sedes Satanae, atque erroris haeretici primatica ('seat of Satan and prime source of heretical error' The diocese consisted of some 80–90 parishes. It hosted one abbey, that of Sorèz, a convent of the Clarisses, a convent of the Daughters of the Cross, a convent of Dominicans, one of Franciscans, one of Capuchins, two of reformed Dominicans, and two houses of the Doctrinaires. The diocese produced some 35,000 livres for the bishop.

The diocese was abolished by the Concordat of 1801.

== History ==
Huguenot control (purple) and influence (violet), 16th cent.

The diocese had its primitive origins in a donation made in 1098 by three sons of Guillaume Seigneur of the chateau of Lavaur, one of whom was Isarn, the Bishop of Toulouse. They gave to the monks of Saint-Pons the church of Saint-Élan (Alain) in the territory of Toulouse, not far from their chateau, on the left bank of the River Agoût; the church was in need of rebuilding; the mission of the monks was to rebuild the church, around which grew a small town (villa). During the Albigensian Crusade the town, which was politically in the County of Toulouse and subject to the heretic Count Raymond of Toulouse, was besieged. The town was fortified in the 13th century. The monastery church became the Cathedral of Saint-Alain in the fourteenth century, when the diocese was created.

Pope John XXII created the diocese of Lavaur in a bull dated 22 February 1317.

The Cathedral Chapter had twelve Canons, among whom were the dignities of Provost, Archdeacon, Sacristan, and Precentor. The Bishop had a vote in Chapter meetings, though he was not a member of the Chapter. There were also four hebdomidary chaplains and twenty-eight ordinary chaplains.

From 1622, the town of Lavaur became headquarters for the royal operations against Henri, Duke of Rohan. The Count de Vieule was named Governor of Castres and Lavaur, and the César, Duke of Vendôme, the natural brother of Louis XIII, was placed in charge of operations. Under Louis XIV, the King took a more active role in determining the talents of prospective bishops of Lavaur.

In 1671 the city of Lavaur had approximately 3,000 Catholics, and the diocese had approximately 65 parishes. In 1768, there were perhaps 4,000 Catholics, and there were 88 parishes.

=== The French Revolution ===
In 1790 the Constituent Assembly passed a number of anti-Catholic laws, the culmination of which was the Civil Constitution of the Clergy, which reduced the number of dioceses in France from 135 to 83, and made these dioceses coterminous with the new civil administrative districts, the 'départements'. The old dioceses were abolished. Clergy were to be provided with salaries, but they were required to take an oath of allegiance to the State. Bishops were to be elected by the electors of each department, rather than appointed by the King and approved by the Pope, as had been provided for in the Concordat of Bologna of 1516 between Francis I and Leo X. An elector need not be a Catholic, which meant that non-Catholics would be taking part in the selection of Catholic bishops. The inevitable result was schism between the French 'Constitutional Church' and the Roman Catholic Church.

The diocese of Lavaur, which was on the schedule of dioceses to be abolished, was subsumed into the new 'diocèse de Tarn', a suffragan of the Metropole du Sud, with its seat at Albi. The electors of Tarn duly met at Castres on 13–15 March 1791, and elected Abbé Jean-Joachim Gausserand as their Constitutional Bishop; it was presumed that Cardinal de Bernis, in refusing to take the oath, had resigned the See of Albi. The Bishop of Lavaur had protested and fled to Spain. Gausserand was consecrated in Paris on 3 April 1791 by the Metropolitan of Rhone-et-Loire (Lyon), Antoine-Adrien Lamourette. The new bishop's reception in Albi was frosty, and in Lavaur it was icy. After the Terror, when religion was reconstituted, Gausserand discovered that he had lost 200 priests through abdication, and that 40 were married; several had left their priestly duties and were functioning as civil administrators. In 1797 he admitted that fewer than 100 priests continued to function in the 'diocese of Tarn'. When the Concordat of 1801 was negotiated between First Consul Bonaparte and Pope Pius VII, Gausserand refused to submit or recant, and, when steps were being taken in 1808 to place him under Interdict, he removed himself to Toulouse. He died on 12 February 1820.

In the implementation of the Concordat of 1801, the diocese of Lavaur was not restored.

== Bishops ==
=== 1300 to 1500 ===
- 1317-1338 : Roger d'Armagnac
- 1338-1348 : Robert de Foix
- 1348-1357 : Archambaud de Lautrec
- 1357-1360 : Gilles Aycelin de Montaigu
- 1360-1383 : Robert de Via de Villamuro
- 1383-1390 : Gilles Aycelin de Bellemère
- 1390-1394 : Guy de la Roche
- 1394-1397 : Bernard de Chevenon
- 1397-1405 : Pierre de Vissac
- 1405-1408 : Bertrand de Maumont
- 1408-1410 : Pierre Neveu
- 1410-1415 : Pierre Girard, Cardinal
- 1415-1433 : Jean Belli
- 1434-1459 : Jean Boucher
- 1460-1469 : Jean Gentian
- 1469-1497 : Jean Vigier
- 1497-1500 : Hector de Bourbon

=== 1500 to 1800 ===
- 1500-1514 : Pierre de Rosergues
- 1514 : Giulio de' Medici, Administrator
- 1514-1525 : Simon de Beausoleil
- 1525-1526 : Pierre de Buis
- 1526-1540 : Georges de Selve
- 1542-1557 : Pierre de Mareuil
- 1557-1577 : Pierre Danès
- 1577-1582 : Pierre Dufaur de Pibrac
- [? 1582-1583 : René de Birague, Cardinal]
- 1583-1601 : Horace de Birague
- 1606-1636 : Claude Duvergier
- 1636-1647 : Charles François d'Abra de Raconis
- 1647-1668 : Jean-Vincent de Tulles
- 1670-1671 : Sébastien de Guémadeuc (Quémadeuc)
- 1671-1673 : Michel Amelot de Gournay
- 1675-1677 : René Le Sauvage
- 1677-1685 : Charles le Goux de la Berchère
  - 1685-1687 : Esprit Fléchier
- 1687-1712 : Victor-Augustin de Mailly-Nesles
- 1713-1748 : Nicolas de Malézieu
- 1748-1764 : Jean-Baptiste Joseph de Fontanges
- 1765-1770 : Jean de Dieu-Raymond de Boisgelin de Cucé
- 1770-1802 : Jean-Antoine de Castellane-Saint-Maurice

== See also ==
- Catholic Church in France
- List of Catholic dioceses in France

== Bibliography ==
=== Reference works ===
- Gams, Pius Bonifatius (1873). Series episcoporum Ecclesiae catholicae: quotquot innotuerunt a beato Petro apostolo. Ratisbon: Typis et Sumptibus Georgii Josephi Manz. pp. 582–584. (Use with caution; obsolete)
- Eubel, Conradus, ed. (1913). Hierarchia catholica, Tomus 1 (second ed.). Münster: Libreria Regensbergiana. (in Latin) pp. 356.
- Eubel, Conradus, ed. (1914). Hierarchia catholica, Tomus 2 (second ed.). Münster: Libreria Regensbergiana. (in Latin) p. 199.
- Gulik, Guilelmus (1923). Eubel, Conradus (ed.). Hierarchia catholica, Tomus 3 (second ed.). Münster: Libreria Regensbergiana. p. 253.
- Gauchat, Patritius (Patrice) (1935). Hierarchia catholica IV (1592-1667). Münster: Libraria Regensbergiana. pp. 252.
- Ritzler, Remigius; Sefrin, Pirminus (1952). Hierarchia catholica medii et recentis aevi V (1667-1730). Patavii: Messagero di S. Antonio. pp. 280.
- Ritzler, Remigius; Sefrin, Pirminus (1958). Hierarchia catholica medii et recentis aevi VI (1730-1799). Patavii: Messagero di S. Antonio. p. 301.
- Sainte-Marthe, Denis de (1785). Gallia christiana, in provincias ecclesiasticas distributa (in Latin). Vol. Tomus tertius decimus (13). Paris: excudebat Johannes- Baptista Coignard, regis & Academiae Gallicae Architypographus. pp. 331–369, Instrumenta, pp. 263–286.

=== Studies ===
- Compayré, Clément (1841). Études historiques et documents inédits sur l'Albigeois, le Castrais, et l'ancien diocèse de Lavaur (in French). Albi: Maurice Papailheau. p. 421.
- De Vic, Cl.; Vaissete, J. (1876). Histoire generale de Languedoc (in French). Vol. Tome IV. Toulouse: Edouard Privat.
- Ruffié, Paul (2000). Lavaur, cité cathare en pays de cocagne (in French). Toulouse: Privat. ISBN 9782708997127.
