= Polisy =

Commune in Grand Est, France

- Commune
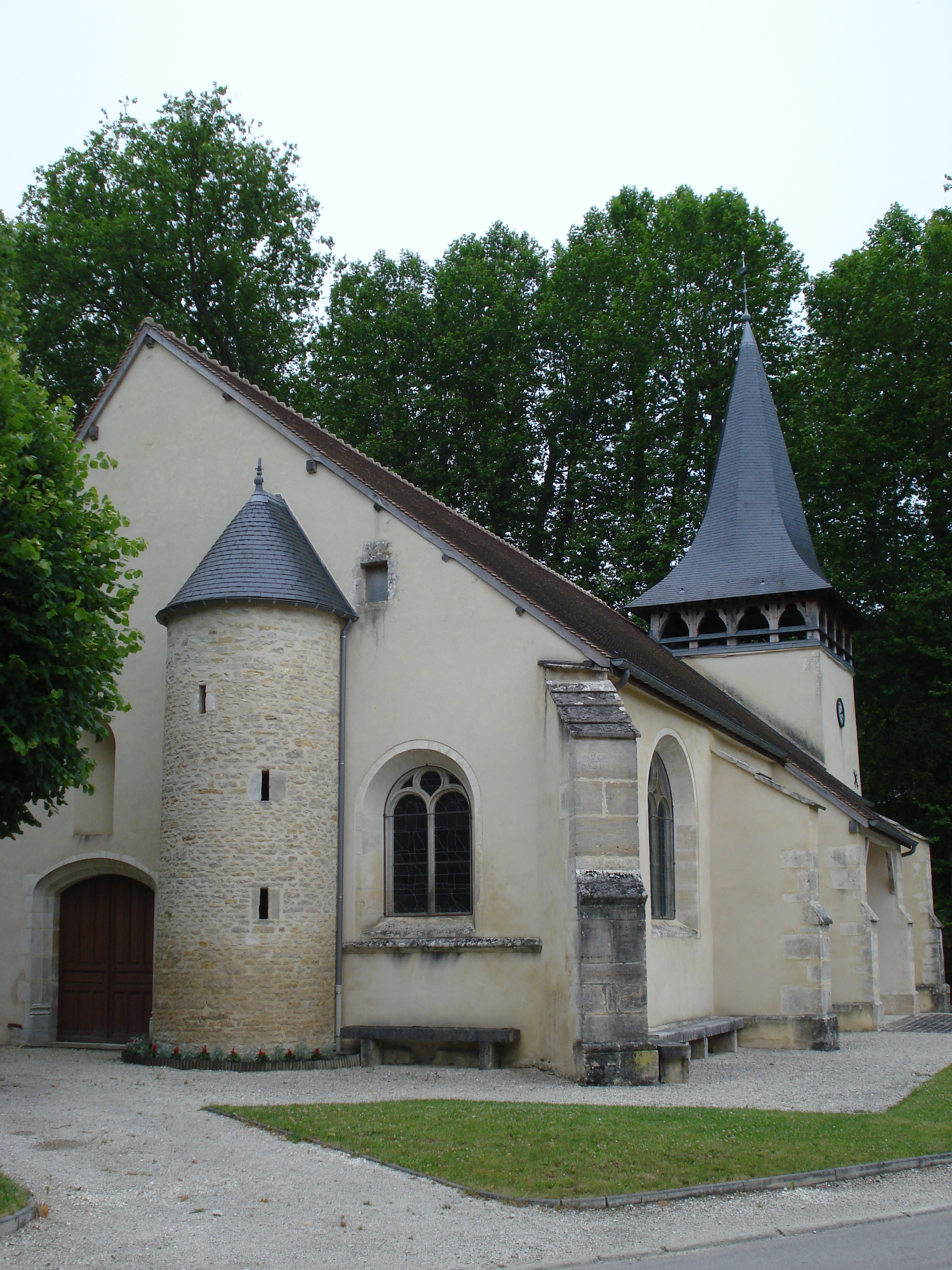
- The church in Polisy

- Coat of arms
- Location of Polisy
- Location within France Location within Grand Est
- Coordinates: 48°03′41″N 4°22′53″E
- Country: France
- Region: Grand Est
- Department: Aube
- Arrondissement: Troyes
- Canton: Bar-sur-Seine

Government
  - Mayor (2020–2026): Elisabeth Dubraud
- Area^{1}: 11.35 km^{2} (4.38 sq mi)
- Elevation: 165 m (541 ft)
- Highest elevation: 292 m (958 ft)
- Lowest elevation: 157 m (515 ft)
- Population (2023): 176
  - Density: 15.5/km^{2} (40.2/sq mi)
- Time zone: UTC+01:00 (CET)
  - Summer (DST): UTC+02:00 (CEST)
- INSEE/Postal code: 10296 /10110
- ^{1} French Land Register data, which excludes lakes, ponds, glaciers > 1 km^{2} (0.386 sq mi or 247 acres) and river estuaries.

Polisy (French pronunciation: [pɔlizi]) is a commune in the Aube department in north-central France.

== Population ==
Historical population
Year	Pop.	±% p.a.
1968	256	—
1975	215	−2.46%
1982	200	−1.03%
1990	207	+0.43%
1999	211	+0.21%
2007	185	−1.63%
2012	170	−1.68%
2017	193	+2.57%
2023	176	−1.53%
Source: INSEE

== See also ==
- Communes of the Aube department
