= Portrait of a Young Merchant =

Painting by Hans Holbein the Younger

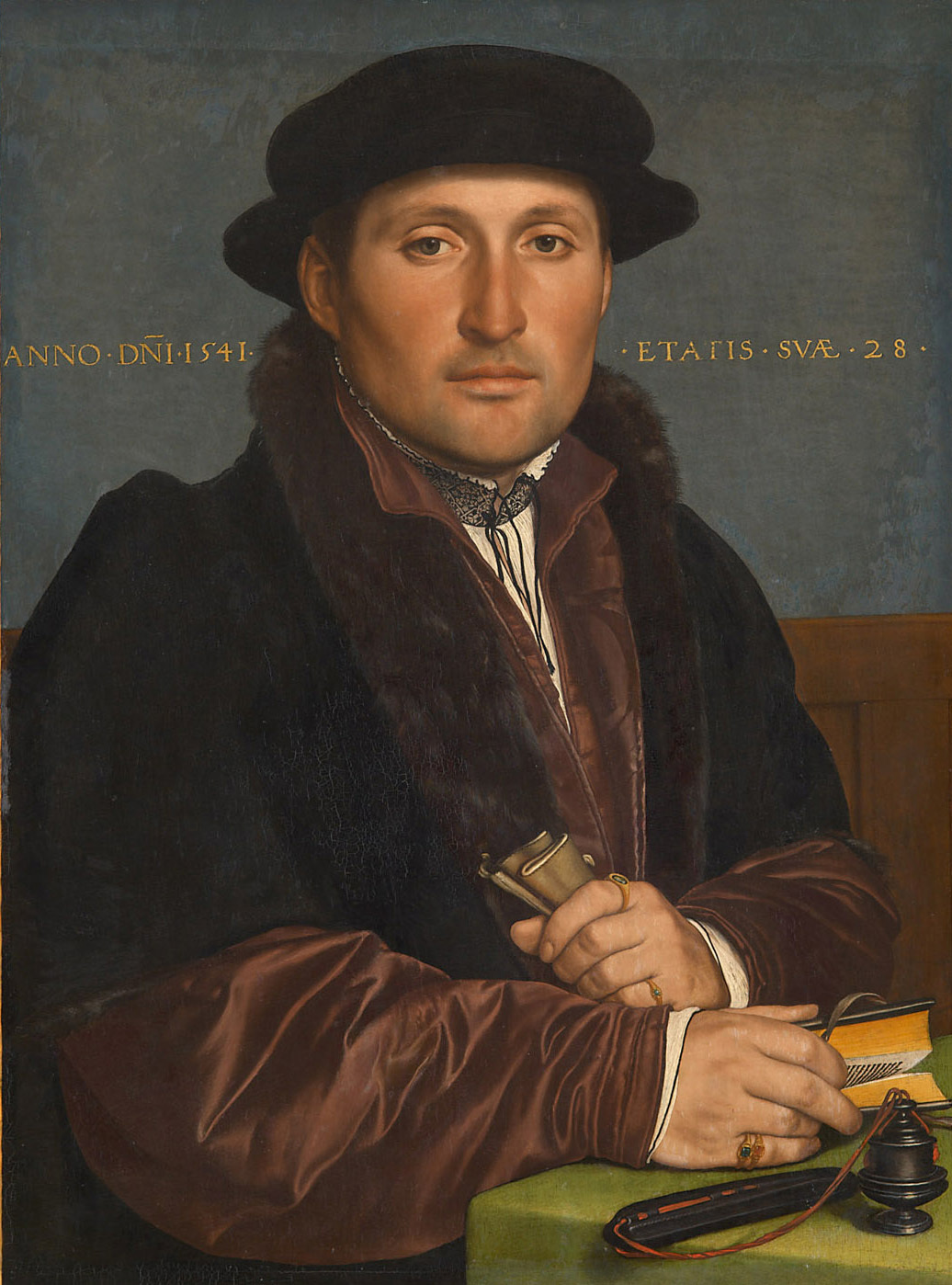
- Artist: Hans Holbein the Younger
- Year: 1541
- Medium: oil and tempera on oak
- Dimensions: 46.5 cm × 34.8 cm (18.3 in × 13.7 in)
- Location: Kunsthistorisches Museum, Vienna, Austria
- Accession: 905
- Website: www.khm.at/en/

Portrait of a Young Merchant is an oil on oak painting completed in 1541 by German painter, Hans Holbein the Younger, now in the collection of the Kunsthistorisches Museum, Vienna. It depicts an unidentified young man against a blue-grey background.

== Description ==
One of the finest portraits of Holbein's later years, it is one of his customary half-length figures, less than life-size, seated at a table, the body turned to the right, and the face looking out at the spectator. His doublet is of brown silk, and over it he wears a black cloak with a deep collar and lining of brown fur, and black cap with a brim. The collar of his white shirt is embroidered with blackwork and tied with black laces. He is holding grey gloves in his left hand, and his right rests on the green cloth on the table, the forefinger thrust within the pages of a gilt-edged book, near which is placed an inkstand with a red cord. On a ring on his left index finger, is an intaglio. His face is clean-shaven, with a ruddy brown complexion, and the hair, which does not cover the ears, is almost concealed by the cap. The young man has pleasant features and his grey-blue eyes "have a far-seeing, visionary expression, which Holbein has rendered with extraordinary vividness and subtlety of drawing." His direct gaze is reminiscent of that of Derek Born (1533). The upper part of the background consists of a blue-grey wall, with wooden panelling, below, and there is an inscription in gold at head height — ANNO·DÑI·1541· // · ETATIS · SVÆ · 28 · — the year: 1541 and sitter's age: 28.

Paul Ganz assumed that he was a German merchant, probably a member of the Steelyard in London, but this is not necessarily the case. John Rowlands and others note that he could equally be English. There is no coat of arms or a merchant's mark to suggest his identity.

In this painting Holbein repeats motifs from his earlier works, for example, Thomas Cromwell (1532–33): the wood panelling in the background, the book and the table covered with a green cloth. The sitter's right hand is remarkably similar to that of Hermann von Wedigh (1532), as are the curiously pointed ear, the ring and gloves of an Unknown Gentleman (c. 1540)

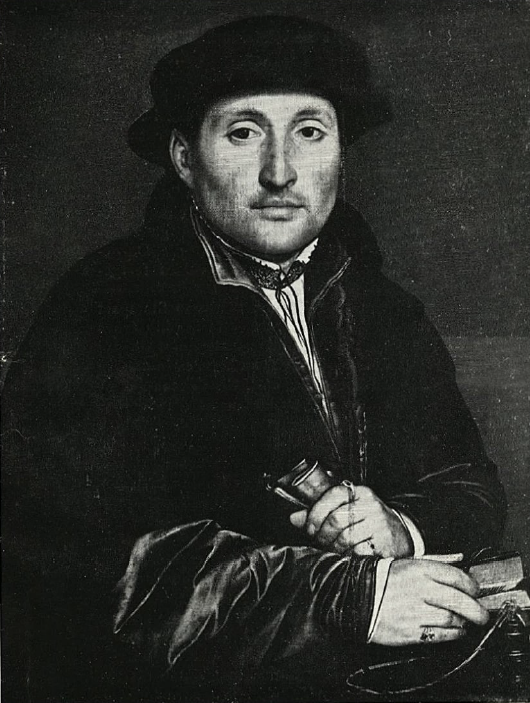
Portrait of a Man, 16th century, after Hans Holbein the Younger, Galleria Regionale della Sicilia, Palermo

== Versions ==
There is an old copy of this portrait in the Galleria Regionale della Sicilia in Palermo.

Elements of the Vienna portrait have been copied by other artists. Portrait of an Unknown Man in the John G. Johnson Collection at the Philadelphia Museum of Art, is a pastiche: the copyist has attached the head of the portrait of Duke Antony the Good of Lorraine to the body of the Portrait of a Young Merchant in Vienna. In the copy of the head the cap is without the gold tags, the beard is slightly shorter, and the sitter appears to be somewhat younger. In that of the body the dress, hands, the rings, gloves, and book follow the Vienna picture closely, but the copyist has transferred the two rings on the little finger of the right hand to the ring-finger.

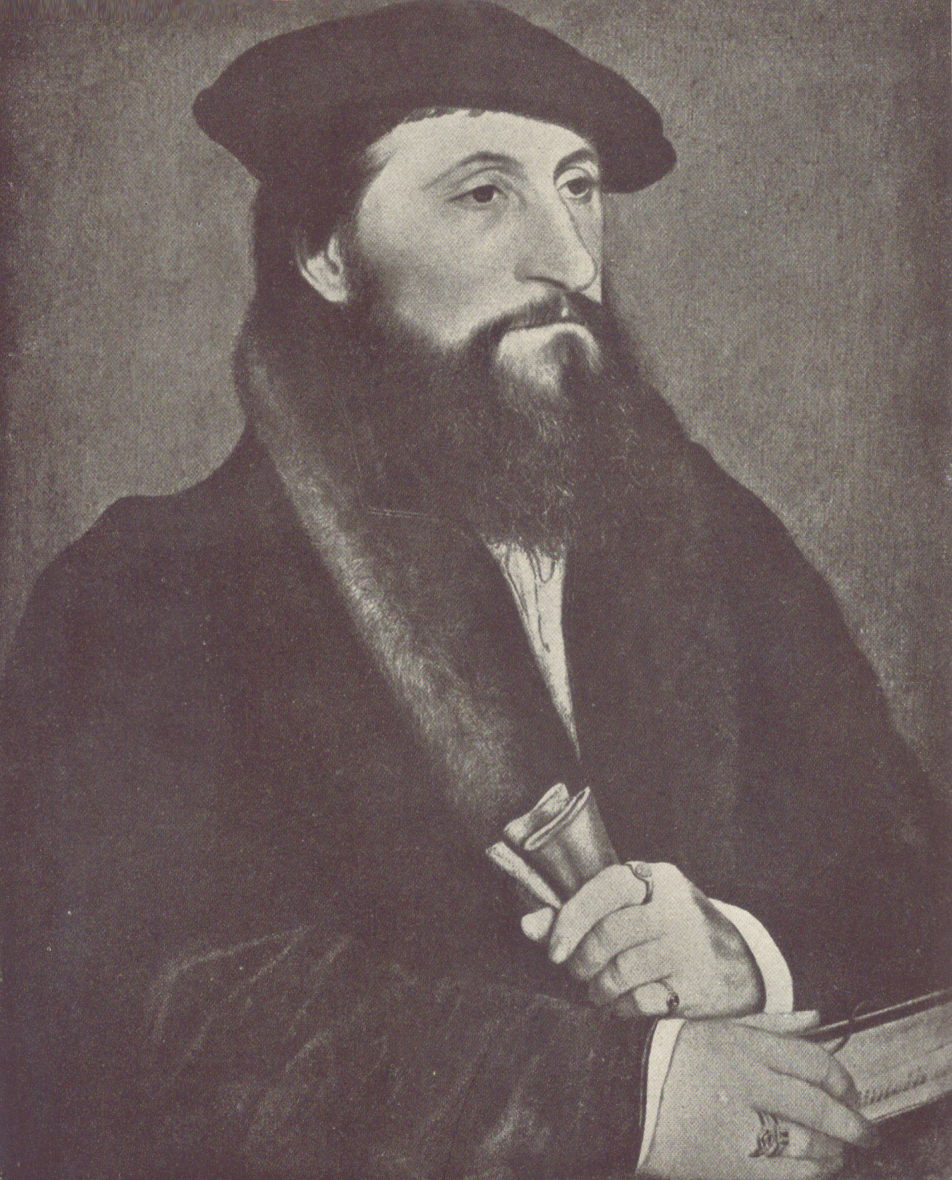
Portrait of an Unknown Man, Antoine, Duke of Lorraine?, Philadelphia Museum of Art

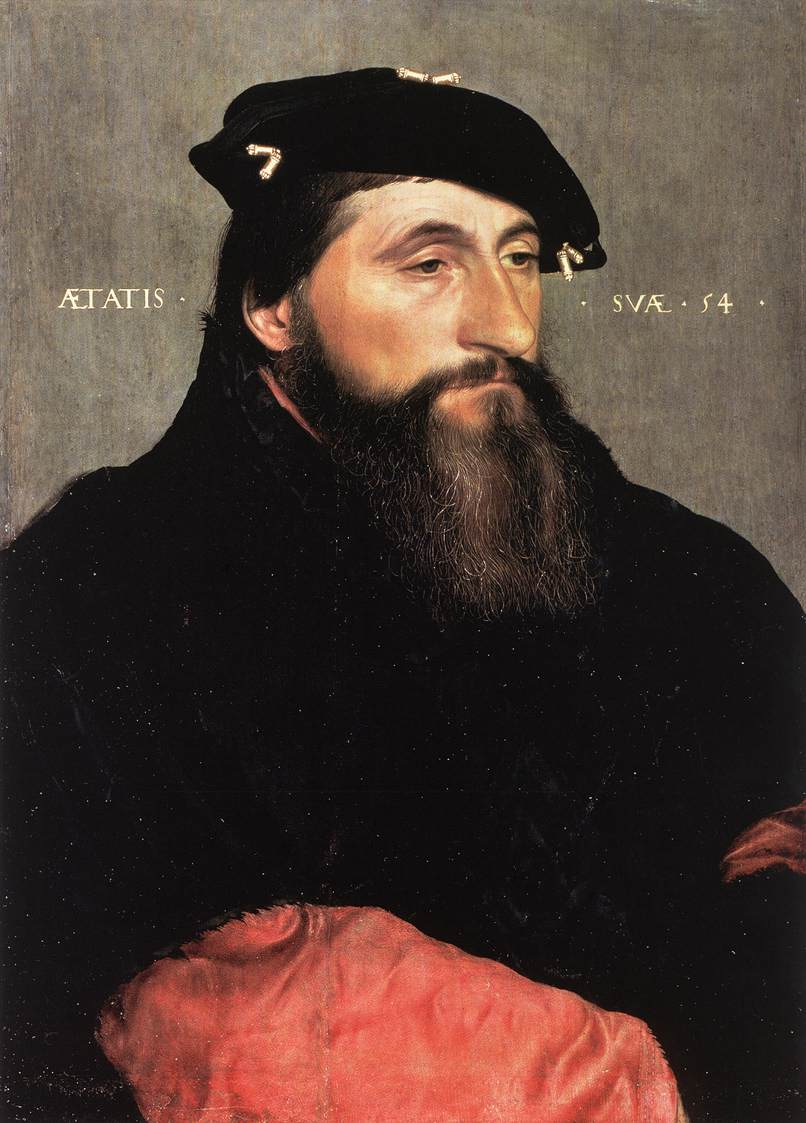
Duke Antony the Good of Lorraine, 1543, Hans Holbein the Younger, Gemäldegalerie, Berlin

Portrait of a Man, by Christoph Amberger, in the collection of Wawel Castle in Kraków, utilises borrowed motifs. The head of an unidentified elderly, bearded man is painted together with the body of the Vienna portrait. The background has been changed and there is no green cloth on the table in the foreground.

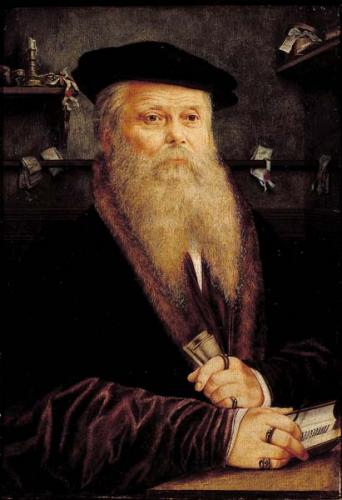
Portrait of a Man, 16th century, Christoph Amberger, Wawel Castle, Kraków

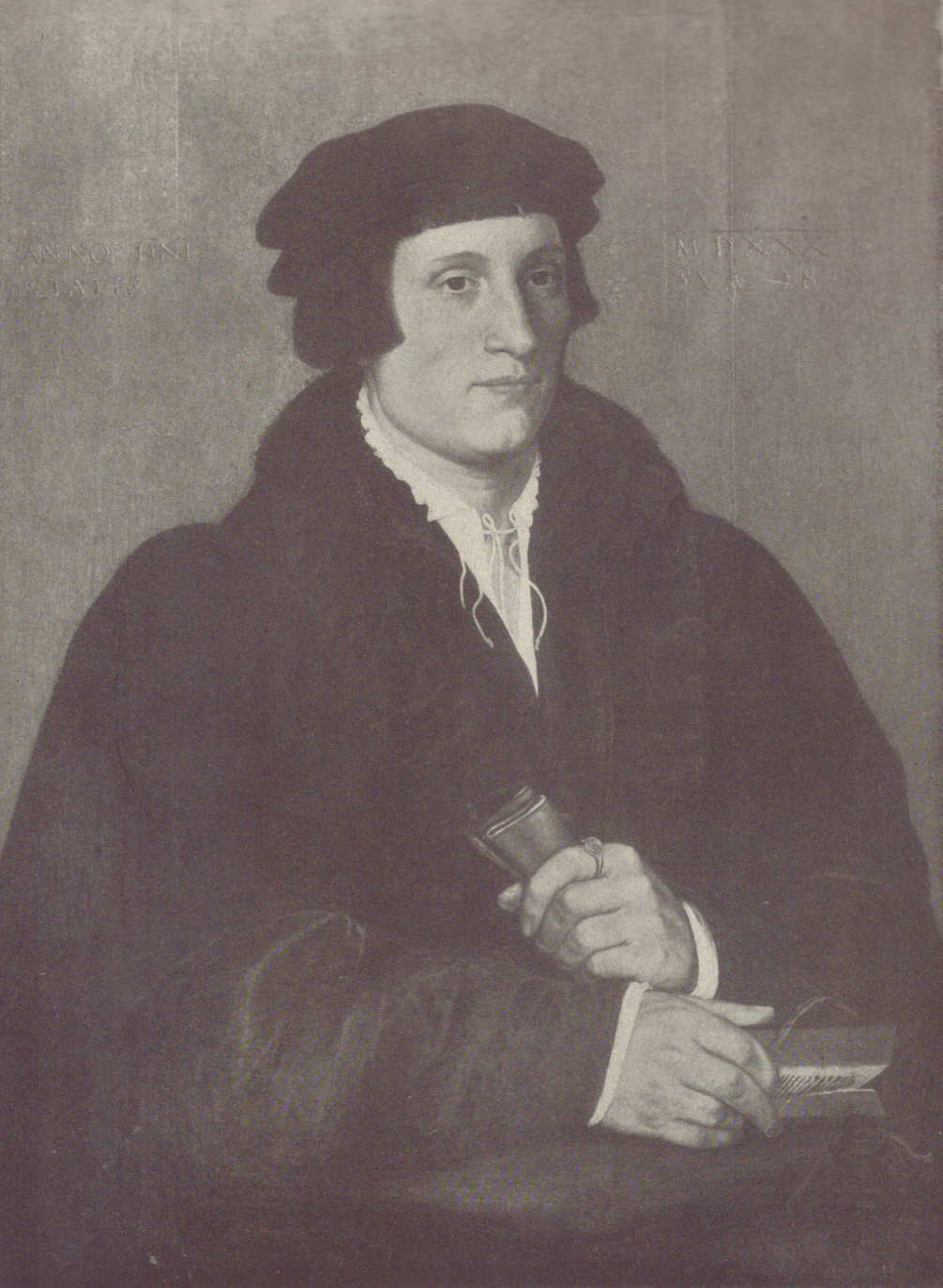
Portrait of an Unknown Man, 1530, after Hans Holbein the Younger, formerly in the collection of Leopold Hirsch, London

Another example of the borrowed motif is Portrait of an Unknown Man, dated 1530, formerly in the collection of Leopold Hirsch, London (present whereabouts unknown). The head of an unidentified young man is added to the body of the Vienna portrait, but the rings on the right hand are omitted. The painting has the inscription: ANNO DNI MDXXX ÆTATIS SVÆ 28 — the year: 1530 and sitter's age: 28.

== Provenance ==
The portrait was in the collection of the Archduke Leopold William by 1659. The collection was bequeathed to his nephew Leopold I.

== See also ==
- List of paintings by Hans Holbein the Younger
