= List of paintings by Hans Holbein the Younger =

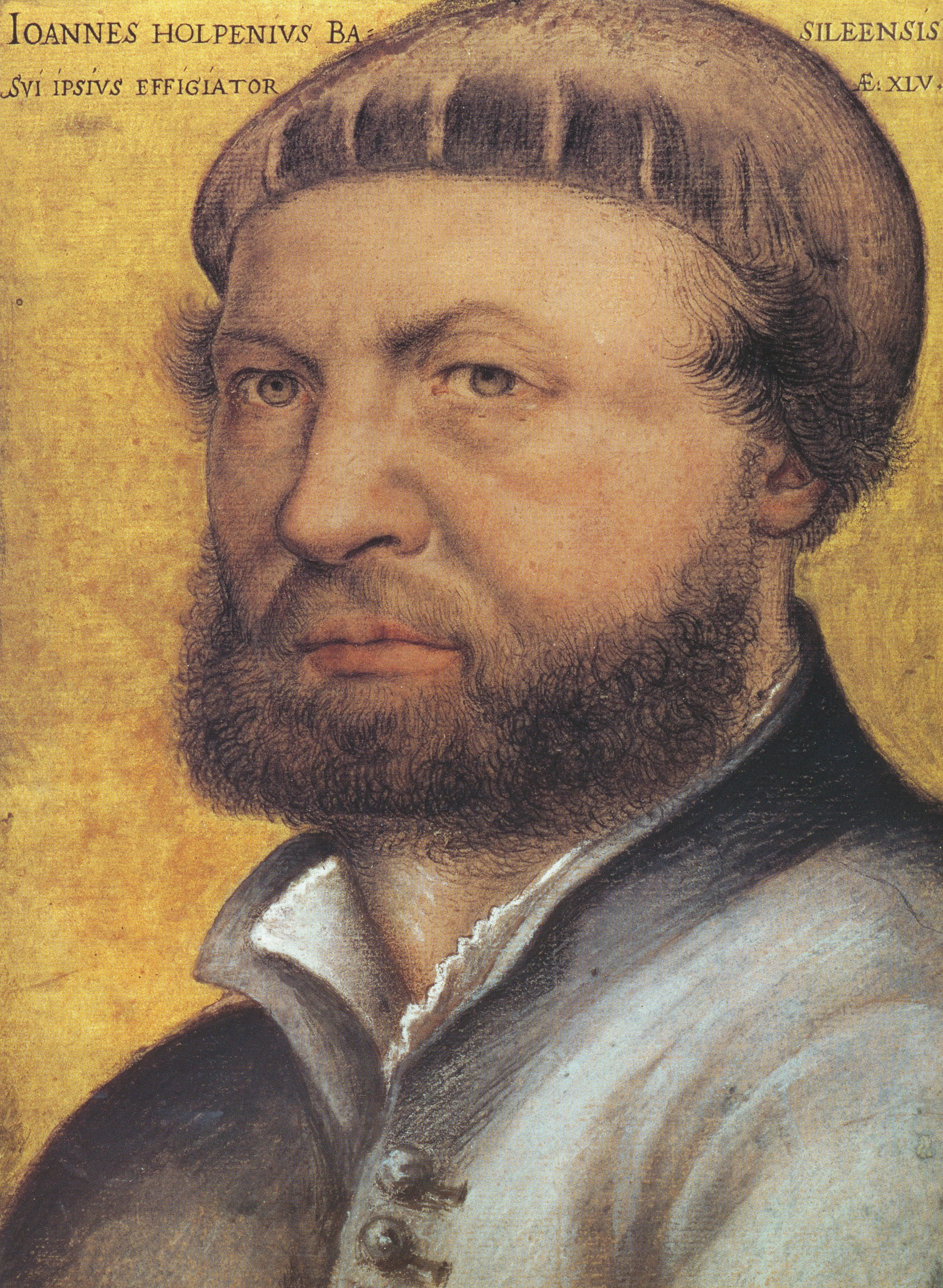
Self-portrait, c. 1542–43. Coloured chalks and pen, heightened with gold, Uffizi Gallery, Florence.

This list of paintings by Hans Holbein the Younger contains a selection of the artist's best-known paintings, as well as a few copies and derivatives of his art, some of which relate to lost works.

Hans Holbein the Younger (c. 1497–1543) was a German artist and printmaker who worked in a Northern Renaissance style. He is best known as one of the greatest portraitists of the 16th century. He also made a significant contribution to the history of book design, and produced religious art, satire, and Reformation propaganda.

Born in Augsburg, Holbein worked mainly in Basel as a young artist, painting murals and religious works and drawing designs for stained glass and printed books. He produced the occasional portrait, and made his international mark with portraits of the famous humanist Desiderius Erasmus of Rotterdam. When the Reformation reached Basel, Holbein produced works for reformist clients while continuing to serve traditional religious patrons. His late-Gothic style was influenced by artistic trends in Italy, France and the Netherlands, as well as by Renaissance humanism, resulting in a combined aesthetic that was uniquely his own.

Holbein travelled to England in 1526 in search of work, armed with a recommendation from Erasmus. He was welcomed into the humanist circle of Thomas More, where he soon built a high reputation. After returning to Basel for four years, in 1532 he resumed his career in England, where he worked for Anne Boleyn and Thomas Cromwell, and was appointed King's Painter to Henry VIII. In this role, he produced designs for jewellery, plates, and other precious objects, as well as for festive decorations. His portraits of the king and his family and courtiers provide a vivid record of a brilliant court, during a momentous period when Henry was assuming power as the Supreme Head of the English church.

== Paintings ==
Work	Description	Date	Medium	Size	Location
	Head of a Female Saint, attributed to Holbein	c. 1515–16	Oil and tempera on spruce wood	23.5 × 21.5 cm	Kunstmuseum Basel
	Head of a Male Saint, attributed to Holbein	c. 1515–16	Oil and tempera on spruce wood	23.5 × 21.5 cm	Kunstmuseum Basel
	Portrait of Jakob Meyer zum Hasen	1516	Oil and tempera on limewood	38.5 × 31 cm	Kunstmuseum Basel
	Portrait of Dorothea Meyer, wife of Jakob Meyer zum Hasen	1516	Oil and tempera on limewood	38.5 × 31 cm	Kunstmuseum Basel
	Signboard for the Schoolmaster Oswald Myconius (with Ambrosius Holbein)	1516	Oil and tempera on pine panel	55.5 × 65.5 cm	Kunstmuseum Basel
	Adam and Eve	1517	Oil and tempera on paper mounted on pine	30.2 × 35.7 cm	Kunstmuseum Basel
	Portrait of Benedikt von Hertenstein	1517	Oil and tempera on paper mounted on wood	52.4 × 38.1 cm	Metropolitan Museum of Art, New York
	Portrait of Bonifacius Amerbach	1519	Oil and tempera on pine	28.5 × 27.4 cm	Kunstmuseum Basel
	Oberried Altarpiece, The Adoration of the Magi, left panel	c 1520	Oil and tempera on pine	230 × 109 cm	University Chapel of the Cathedral, Freiburg im Breisgau
	Oberried Altarpiece, The Birth of Christ, right panel	c 1520	Oil and tempera on pine	230 × 109 cm	University Chapel of the Cathedral, Freiburg im Breisgau
	The Body of the Dead Christ in the Tomb	1521–22	Oil and tempera on limewood	30.6 × 200 cm	Kunstmuseum Basel
	The Solothurn Madonna	1522	Oil and tempera on limewood	140.5 × 102 cm	Kunstmuseum Solothurn
	Portrait of Johannes Froben	c 1522–23	Oil on panel	48.8 × 32.4 cm	Royal Collection
	Portrait of Erasmus of Rotterdam writing	1523	Oil and tempera on paper mounted on pine	36.8 × 30.5 cm	Kunstmuseum Basel
	Portrait of Erasmus of Rotterdam writing	1523	Oil and tempera on wood	43 × 33 cm	Louvre, Paris
	Portrait of Erasmus of Rotterdam	1523	Oil and tempera on wood	76 × 51 cm	National Gallery, London, on loan from Longford Castle
	Printer's Device of Johannes Froben	c 1523	Tempera on canvas, heightened with gold	44 × 31 cm	Kunstmuseum Basel
	Allegory of the Old and New Law	Unknown date between 1524 and 1535	Oil and tempera on oak	49 × 60 cm	National Gallery of Scotland, Edinburgh
	The Passion altarpiece, the two left panels	c. 1524–25	Oil and tempera on limewood	136 × 31 cm and 149.5 × 31 cm	Kunstmuseum Basel
	The Passion altarpiece, the two right panels	1524–25	Oil and tempera on limewood	149.5 × 31 cm and 136 × 31 cm	Kunstmuseum Basel
	The Last Supper	c 1524–25	Oil and tempera on limewood	115.5 × 97.3 cm	Kunstmuseum Basel
	Lais of Corinth	1526	Oil and tempera on limewood	34.6 × 26.8 cm	Kunstmuseum Basel
	Portrait of a Man with a Lute	c. 1526–27	Oil and tempera on oak	43.5 × 43.5 cm	Berlin State Museums
	The Darmstadt Madonna (the Madonna of Jakob Meyer zum Hasen)	1526 and 1528–30	Oil and tempera on limewood	146.5 × 102 cm	Johanniterkirche, Schwäbisch Hall
	Noli me Tangere	Unknown date, perhaps 1526 to 1528	Oil and tempera on oak	76.8 × 94.9 cm	Royal Collection
	Portrait of Sir Thomas More	1527	Oil and tempera on oak	74.2 × 59 cm	Frick Collection, New York
	Portrait of William Warham, Archbishop of Canterbury	1527	Oil and tempera on oak	82 × 67 cm	Louvre, Paris
	Portrait of Sir Henry Guildford	1527	Oil and tempera on oak	82.6 × 66.4 cm	Royal Collection, Windsor Castle
	Portrait of Mary, Lady Guildford	1527	Oil and tempera on oak	87 × 70.5 cm	Saint Louis Art Museum, Saint Louis, Missouri
	Portrait of a Lady with a Squirrel and a Starling	c. 1527–28	Oil and tempera on oak	54 × 38.7 cm	National Gallery, London
	Portrait of Thomas Godsalve and his son John	1528	Oil and tempera on oak	35 × 36 cm	Gemäldegalerie Alte Meister, Dresden
	Portrait of Nikolaus Kratzer	1528	Oil and tempera on oak	83 × 67 cm	Louvre, Paris
	Portrait of the Artist's Family	c. 1528–29	Oil and tempera on paper, cut out and mounted on wood	79.4 × 64.7 cm	Kunstmuseum Basel
	Rehoboam, fragment of wall painting	1530	Painting on plaster	28 × 41.5 cm	Kunstmuseum Basel
	Miniature Portrait of Erasmus of Rotterdam	c. 1532	Oil and tempera on limewood	10 cm diameter	Kunstmuseum Basel
	Portrait of Hermann von Wedigh	1532	Oil and tempera on wood	42.2 × 32.4 cm	Metropolitan Museum of Art, New York
	Portrait of the Merchant Georg Gisze	1532	Oil and tempera on oak	90.3 × 85.7 cm	Berlin State Museums
	Portrait of Thomas Cromwell	c. 1532–33	Oil and tempera on oak	76 × 61 cm	Frick Collection, New York
	A Merchant of the German Steelyard: 'Hans of Antwerp'	c. 1532–33	Oil and tempera on oak	61 × 46.8 cm	Royal Collection
	Portrait of a Woman in a White Coif	c. 1532–34	Oil and tempera on oak	23.4 × 18.8 cm	Detroit Institute of Arts
	Portrait of William Reskimer	c. 1532–34	Oil and tempera on oak	46.4 × 33.7 cm	Royal Collection, Windsor Castle
	Miniature Portrait of Philipp Melanchthon	c. 1530–1535	Oil and tempera on oak	9 cm diameter	Lower Saxony State Museum, Hanover
	Miniature Portrait of a Man in a Red Cap	c. 1532–35	Oil and tempera on wood	9.5 cm diameter	Metropolitan Museum of Art, New York
	Miniature Portrait of George Nevill, 5th Baron Bergavenny	c. 1532–35			Duke of Buccleuch collection
	Portrait of Derich Born	1533	Oil and tempera on oak	60.3 × 45 cm	Royal Collection, Windsor Castle
	Derich Born	c. 1533	Oil and tempera on red beech	13.1 cm diameter	Alte Pinakothek, Munich
	Portrait of Robert Cheseman	1533	Oil and tempera on oak	59 × 62.5 cm	Mauritshuis, The Hague
	Portrait of Hermann Hillebrandt de Wedigh	1533	Oil and tempera on oak	42.1 × 32.6 cm	Gemäldegalerie, Berlin
	Portrait of Dirk Tybis	1533	Oil and tempera on oak	48 × 35 cm	Kunsthistorisches Museum, Vienna
	Portrait of Cyriacus Kale	1533	Oil and tempera on oak	60 × 44 cm	Herzog Anton Ulrich Museum, Braunschweig
	Double Portrait of Jean de Dinteville and Georges de Selve ("The Ambassadors")	1533	Oil and tempera on oak	207 × 209 cm	National Gallery, London
	Portrait Miniature of a Young Man with a Pink	1533	Oil on oak	12.4 × 12.1 cm	Upton House, Bearsted Collection
	Portrait of Sir Brian Tuke	c. 1533–35	Oil and tempera on oak	49.1 × 38.5 cm	National Gallery of Art, Washington, D. C.
	E Cosi Desio me Mena, Allegory of Love	c. 1533–36	Oil on oak in lozenge format	45 × 45 cm	J. Paul Getty Museum, Los Angeles
	Miniature Portrait of a Court Official	1534	Oil and tempera on limewood	12 cm diameter	Kunsthistorisches Museum, Vienna
	Miniature Portrait of a Court Official's Wife	1534	Oil and tempera on limewood	12 cm diameter	Kunsthistorisches Museum, Vienna
	Portrait of Charles de Solier, Sieur de Morette	1534–35	Oil and tempera on oak	92.5 × 75.4 cm	Gemäldegalerie Alte Meister, Dresden
	Solomon and the Queen of Sheba	c. 1534–35	Pen and brush in bistre and grey wash, heightened in white, gold, and oxidised silver with red and green watercolour over black chalk on vellum	22.9 × 18.2 cm	Royal Library, Windsor
	Portrait of Simon George	c. 1534–37	Oil and tempera on oak	Diameter 31 cm	Städelsches Kunstinstitut, Frankfurt
	Portrait of an Unknown English Lady	1535	Tempera on Oak	32 × 25 cm	Oskar Reinhart Collection 'Am Römerholz', Winterthur
	Portrait of Derich Berck	1536	Oil and tempera transferred to canvas	53.3 × 42.6 cm	Metropolitan Museum of Art, New York
	Portrait Miniature of William Roper	c. 1536	Bodycolour on vellum mounted on card	4.5 cm diameter	Metropolitan Museum of Art, New York
	Portrait Miniature of Margaret Roper	c. 1536	Bodycolour on vellum mounted on card	4.5 cm diameter	Metropolitan Museum of Art, New York
	Portrait of Sir Richard Southwell	1536	Oil and tempera on oak	47.5 × 38 cm	Uffizi, Florence
	Portrait of Sir Thomas Lestrange	1536	Oil and tempera on wood	39.4 × 26.7 cm	Kimbell Art Museum, Fort Worth, Texas
	Portrait of Sir Henry Wyatt	c. 1537	Oil and tempera on oak	39 × 31 cm	Louvre, Paris
	Portrait of Henry VIII	c. 1536–37	Oil and tempera on oak	28 × 20 cm	Thyssen-Bornemisza Museum, Madrid
	Portrait of Jane Seymour	1537	Oil and tempera on oak	65 × 40 cm	Kunsthistorisches Museum, Vienna
	Mural of Henry VIII, Jane Seymour, Henry VII, and Elizabeth of York	1536–1537			Destroyed in Whitehall Palace fire, 1698
	Portrait Miniature of Hans Schwarzwaldt	c. 1535–1540	Watercolour on vellum mounted on playing card	3.8 cm diameter	Royal Collections, The Hague
	Portrait of Christina of Denmark	1538	Oil and tempera on oak	179 × 82.5 cm	National Gallery, London
	Hanseatic Merchant	1538	Oil on oak panel	49.6 x 39 cm	Yale University Art Gallery, New Haven CT
	Portrait Miniature of Elizabeth, Lady Audley	c. 1538	Watercolour on vellum mounted on playing card	5.6 cm diameter	Royal Collection, Windsor castle
	Portrait of Thomas Howard, 3rd Duke of Norfolk	c. 1539	Oil and tempera on oak	80.3 × 61.6 cm	Royal Collection, Windsor Castle
	Portrait of Edward, Prince of Wales	c. 1539	Oil and tempera on oak	57 × 44 cm	National gallery of Art, Washington, D. C.
	Portrait of Anne of Cleves	c. 1539	Oil and tempera on parchment mounted on canvas	65 × 48 cm	Louvre, Paris
	Portrait Miniature of Anne of Cleves	c. 1539	Watercolour and gum on vellum in ivory case	4.6 cm diameter	Victoria and Albert Museum, London
	Portrait of a Lady, perhaps Katherine Howard	c. 1540	Bodycolour on vellum mounted on playing card	6.4 cm diameter	Royal Collection, Windsor Castle
	Portrait Miniature of Katherine Howard	c. 1540	Watercolour on vellum	5.3 cm diameter	Buccleuch collection, Strawberry Hill House
	Portrait of a Lady, probably a Member of the Cromwell Family	c. 1535–1540	Oil and tempera on oak	74 × 48 cm	Toledo Museum of Art
	Portrait Miniature of Jane Small, also called "Jane Pemberton"	c. 1540	Bodycolour on vellum	5.3 cm diameter	Victoria and Albert Museum, London
	Portrait of an Unknown Man, Holding his Gloves and a Letter	c. 1540	Oil and tempera on oak	56 × 48 cm	Private collection
	Portrait of an Unknown Man	c. 1540–43	Oil and tempera on oak	44.4 × 34.2 cm	English Heritage, Audley End House
	Portrait Miniature of Henry Brandon	1541	Bodycolour on vellum mounted on playing card	5.7 cm diameter	Royal Collection, Windsor Castle
	Portrait Miniature of Charles Brandon	1541	Bodycolour on vellum mounted on playing card	5.7 cm diameter	Royal Collection, Windsor Castle
	Roelof de Vos van Steenwijk (circa 1504 - circa 1564)	1541	On oak	47.5 × 37.3 cm	Berlin State Museums
	Portrait of a Young Merchant	1541	Oil and tempera on oak	46.5 × 34.8 cm	Kunsthistorisches Museum, Vienna
	Portrait Miniature of a Young Woman with a White Coif	1541	Oil and tempera on panel	11.11 cm diameter	Los Angeles County Museum of Art
	Portrait of a Man with a Falcon	1542	Oil and tempera on oak	25 × 19 cm	Mauritshuis, The Hague
	Portrait of Henry Howard, Earl of Surrey	c. 1542	Oil and tempera on oak	55.5 × 44 cm	São Paulo Museum of Art, Brazil
	Portrait of an English Lady	c. 1541–43	Oil and tempera on oak	19.2 × 15.3 cm	Kunsthistorisches Museum, Vienna
	Self-portrait	c. 1542–1543	Coloured chalks and pen	32× 26 cm	Uffizi, Florence
	Portrait of Dr John Chambers	c. 1543	Oil and tempera on oak	51 × 44 cm	Kunsthistorisches Museum, Vienna
	Portrait of Sir William Butts	c. 1543	Oil and tempera, formerly on oak panel, transferred to canvas in 1941	47 × 36.8 cm	Isabella Stewart Gardner Museum, Boston
	Portrait of Lady Margaret Butts	c. 1543	Oil and tempera on oak	46 × 37 cm	Isabella Stewart Gardner Museum, Boston
	Portrait of Johann von Schwarzwaldt	1543	Tempera on parchment	5.4 cm diameter	Pushkin State Museum of Fine Arts, Moscow
	Portrait of Antony the Good, Duke of Lorraine	c. 1543	Oil and tempera on oak	51 × 37 cm	Berlin State Museums
	Henry VIII and the Barber Surgeons, reworked and overpainted by other hands	c. 1543	Oil on oak	108.3 × 312.4 cm	Worshipful Company of Barbers, London

== Copies and derivative works ==
Work	Description	Date	Medium	Size	Location
	Portrait of a Woman from Southern Germany, former attribution	c. 1520–1525	Oil on panel	45 × 34 cm	Mauritshuis, The Hague
	Portrait of Nikolaus Kratzer, after Holbein	c. 1528	Oil on panel	81.9 × 64.8 cm	National Portrait Gallery (London)
	Portrait of Desiderius Erasmus of Rotterdam, Holbein's workshop	c. 1530	Oil and tempera on limewood	18.2 × 14.5 cm	Kunstmuseum Basel
	Portrait of Sir Nicholas Carew, workshop or follower of Holbein	Probably 1530s	Oil and tempera on wood	95.3 × 112 cm	Duke of Buccleuch, Drumlanrig Castle, Dumfries
	Portrait of an Unidentified Gentleman, workshop or follower of Holbein	1535	Oil on oak	30.5 cm diameter	Metropolitan Museum of Art, New York
	Portrait of Sir Nicholas Poyntz, after Holbein	c.1535	Oil on panel	42.5 × 29.2 cm	National Portrait Gallery, London
	Portrait Miniature of an Unidentified Man, possibly Hans of Antwerp, workshop of Holbein	c. 1535–40	Oil and tempera on oak	13 cm diameter	Victoria and Albert Museum, London.
	Portrait of Jane Seymour, after Holbein	c. 1537	Oil and tempera on oak	26.3 × 18.7 cm	Mauritshuis, The Hague
	Portrait Miniature of Thomas Cromwell, after Holbein	c. 1537	Watercolour and bodycolour on vellum	4.4 cm diameter	National Portrait Gallery, London
	Portrait Miniature of Thomas Cromwell, after Holbein	c. 1537	Watercolour and bodycolour on vellum	4.4 cm diameter	National Portrait Gallery, London
	Portrait of Prince Edward, after Holbein	16th century, after c. 1538	Oil on panel	59 × 44.5cm	Berger Collection, Denver Art Museum
Workshop of Hans Holbein the Younger portrait of a Lady	Portrait of a Young Woman, Holbein's Workshop	c. 1540 - 1545	Oil and gold on oak	28.3 x 23.2 cm	Metropolitan Museum of Art, New York
	Lady Lee (Margaret Wyatt), Holbein's workshop	c. 1540	Oil on panel	44.1 × 34 cm	Metropolitan Museum of Art, New York
	Portrait of Henry VIII, Holbein's workshop	c. 1540	Oil on oak	88.2 × 75 cm	Galleria Nazionale d'Arte Antica, Rome
	Portrait of Elizabeth, Lady Rich, after Holbein	c. 1540	Oil and tempera on wood (probably oak)	44.5 × 33.9 cm	Metropolitan Museum of Art, New York
	Portrait of Henry VIII in a Great Coat Holding a Staff, after Holbein	1542	Oil and tempera on oak	92.7 × 66.7 cm	Castle Howard, Yorkshire
	Portrait Miniature of Hans Holbein the Younger, copy of Holbein's self-portrait, probably by Lucas Horenbout	1543	Watercolour on vellum mounted on playing card	3.7 cm diameter	Wallace Collection, London
	Portrait of Henry VIII, after Holbein	After 1537, possibly c 1567	Oil on canvas	233.7 × 134.6 cm	Walker Art Gallery, Liverpool
	Portrait of Sir William Butts, after Holbein	c 1543	Oil on panel	47 × 37.5 cm	National Portrait Gallery, London
	Henry VIII, studio of Holbein	c 1543-1547	Oil on oak panel	237.5 x 120.7 cm	National Trust, Petworth House
	Portrait of George Brooke, 9th Baron Cobham	After 1544	Oil on panel	32 cm diameter	Private collection
	Edward VI (1537–1553), When Duke of Cornwall. Holbein's Workshop	c. 1545; reworked 1547 or later	Oil and gold on oak	32.4 cm diameter	Metropolitan Museum of Art, New York
	Portrait Miniature of Thomas Wriothesley, 1st Earl of Southampton, after Holbein	Probably second half of 16th century	Watercolour on vellum laid on card	Oval of 5 × 3 cm	Metropolitan Museum of Art, New York
	The Family of Thomas More, by Rowland Lockey, after Holbein's lost painting	1592	Oil on canvas		Nostell Priory, West Yorkshire
	Dresden Madonna, copy by Bartholomäus Sarburgh^{(de)} of Holbein's Darmstadt Madonna	c. 1635–37	Oil on oak	159 × 103 cm	Gemäldegalerie Alte Meister, Dresden
	Portrait of Johann Froben, after Holbein	16th or beginning of 17th century, after an original of 1520–26	Oil and tempera on oak	39.5 × 33.5 cm	Kunstmuseum Basel
	Portrait of Desiderius Erasmus of Rotterdam, Holbein's workshop, with later additions	c. 1523–40, background c. 1629	Oil on wood	54.7 x 32.4 cm	Royal Collection, Windsor Castle
	Henry VII, Elizabeth of York, Henry VIII, and Jane Seymour, copy by Remigius van Leemput of Holbein's Whitehall Mural, destroyed by fire in 1698	1667	Oil on canvas	88.9 × 99.2 cm	Royal Collection, Windsor Castle

== See also ==
- List of portrait drawings by Hans Holbein the Younger
