= Double Portrait of Jakob Meyer zum Hasen and Dorothea Kannengießer =

Painting by Hans Holbein the Younger

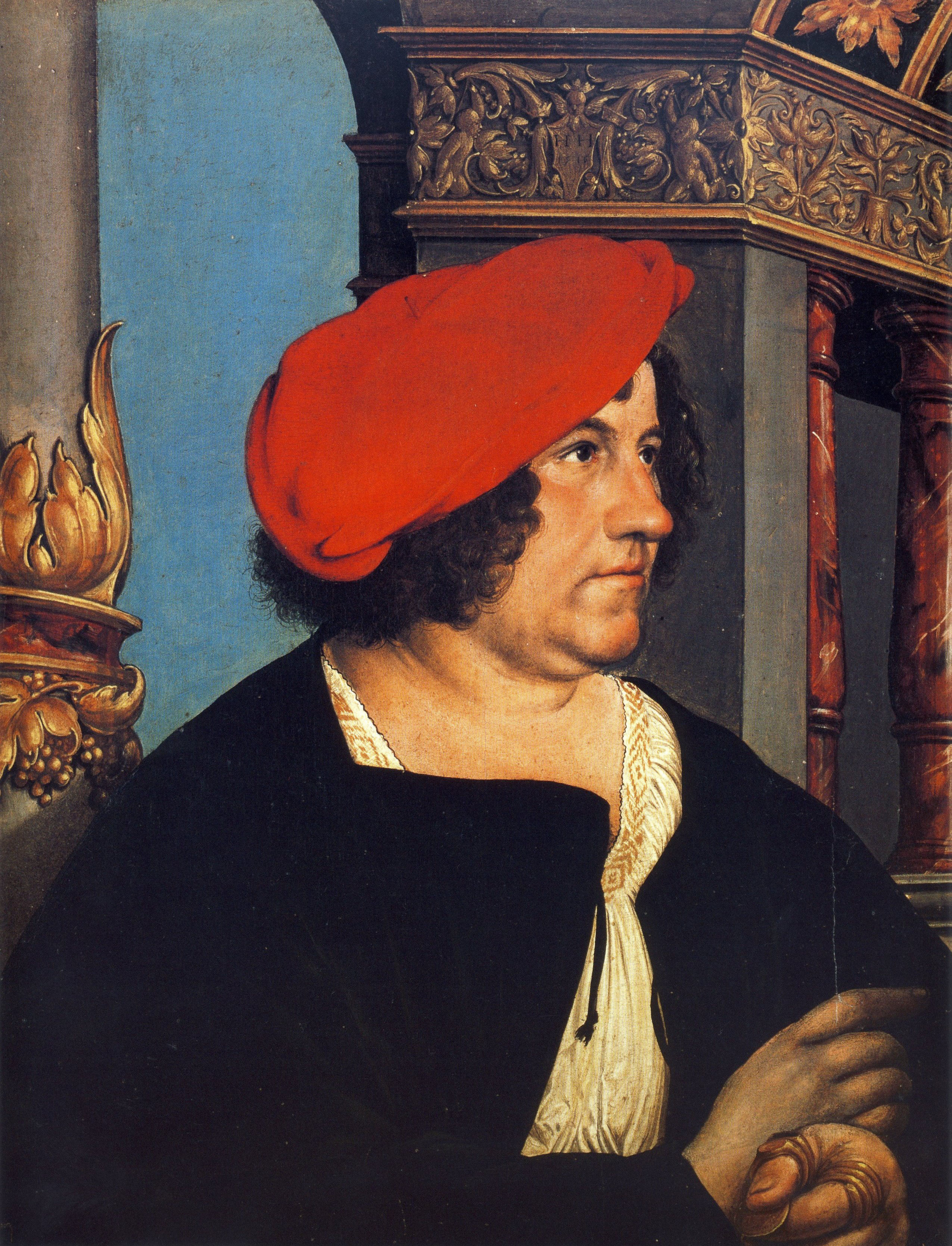
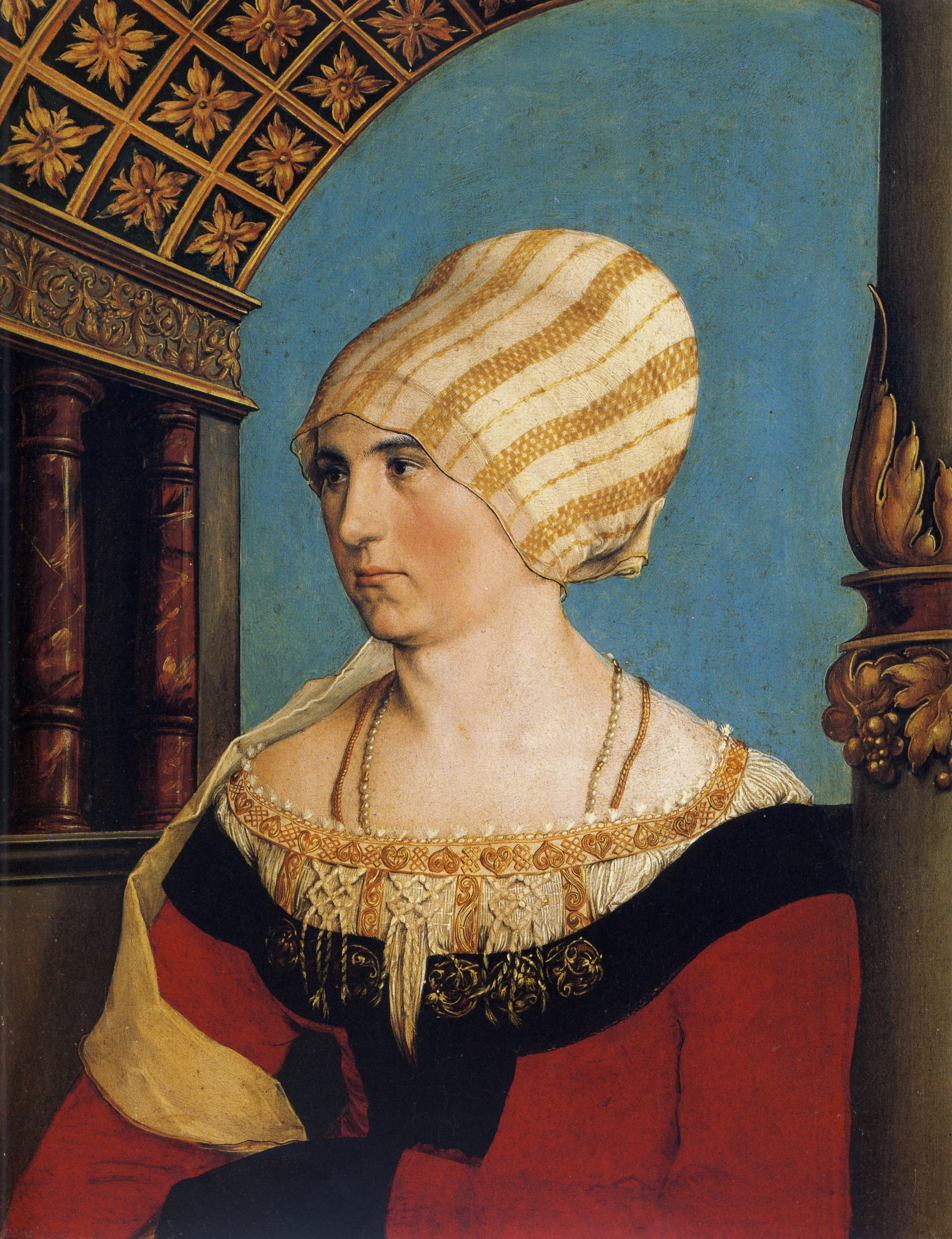
Meyer and his wife by Hans Holbein the Younger, 1516

The Double Portrait of Jakob Meyer zum Hasen and Dorothea Kannengießer is a 1516 oil-on-limewood panel painting by the German-Swiss Northern Renaissance master Hans Holbein the Younger. The two panels were commissioned by Jakob Meyer zum Hasen, mayor of Basel, and show him and his second wife Dorothea Kannengießer. The occasion for the portrait could be Meyer zum Hasen's election as the mayor the same year. Holbein was eighteen years old at the time and had arrived in Basel together with his brother Ambrosius only in 1515. He signed with the letters HH. He received the right to sign with his full name in 1519, when he was accepted as a member of the painters' guild of Basel.

They are the earliest surviving portraits by the artist and are linked to drawings he may have made in his hometown of Augsburg. The painting came into possession of the Faesch Museum founded by Remigius Faesch who was married with Rosa Irmi, a granddaughter of Jakob Meyer zum Hasen. It was exhibited in the Museum Faesch until 1823, today both panels are exhibited in the Kunstmuseum Basel.

== See also ==
- List of paintings by Hans Holbein the Younger
