= Darmstadt Madonna =

Painting by Hans Holbein the Younger

Darmstadt madonna
- Darmstädter Madonna (German)
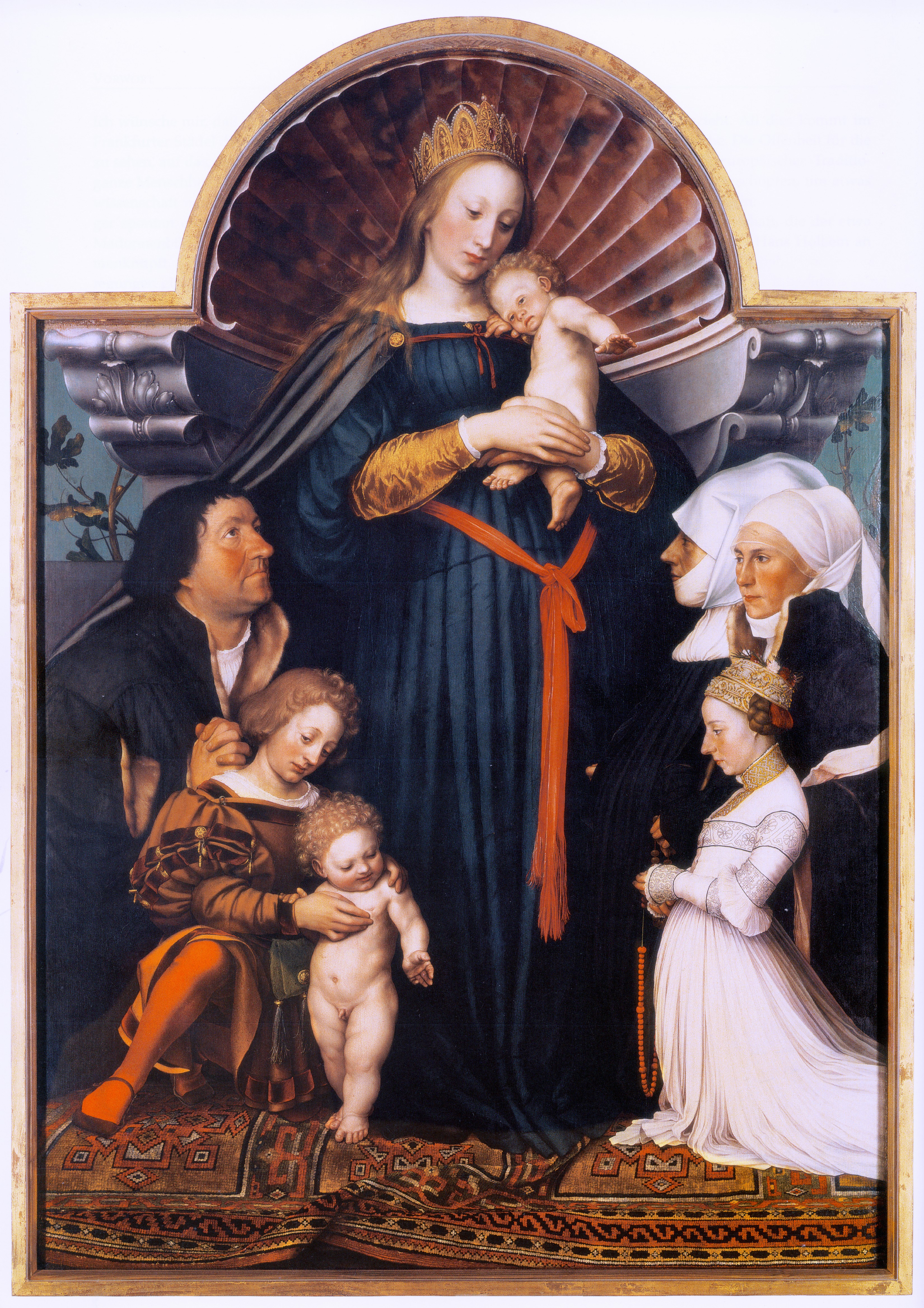
- Artist: Hans Holbein the Younger
- Year: 1526–1530
- Medium: Oil on wood
- Dimensions: 146.5 cm × 102 cm (57.7 in × 40 in)

The Darmstadt Madonna (also known as the Madonna of Jakob Meyer zum Hasen) is an oil painting by the German-Swiss artist Hans Holbein the Younger. Completed ca. 1526—1530 in Basel, the work shows the Bürgermeister of Basel Jakob Meyer zum Hasen, his first wife (who had died earlier), his current wife, and his daughter grouped around the Madonna and infant Jesus.

The meaning of the two other male figures on the left side (the Madonna's right) is, like the overall iconography of the image, not entirely clear. Franny Moyle writes that the man on the Madonna's right is Meyer, and "[t]he boy and baby may be a presentation of Meyer's two deceased sons...." The image testified to the resolutely Catholic faith of the Bürgermeister, who actively opposed the Reformation.

Holbein's Darmstadt Madonna was influenced by Italian Renaissance religious painting; Franny Moyle writes that it was influenced by Andrea Mantegna's 1496 Madonna della Vittoria, and that the two paintings' "perspectival approach ... is almost identical." The Darmstadt Madonna may also contain elements of Netherlandish portrait painting.

Earlier located in Darmstadt, hence its title, the work was on loan to the Städelschen Kunstinstitut in Frankfurt am Main from 2004 to 2011. In 2012, the painting was put on display in the Johanniterkirche in Schwäbisch Hall as part of the permanent exhibition of the Old Masters in the Würth Collection.

== See also ==
- List of paintings by Hans Holbein the Younger
- List of most expensive paintings
