= Jane Pemberton Small =

Subject of a portrait by Hans Holbein the Younger

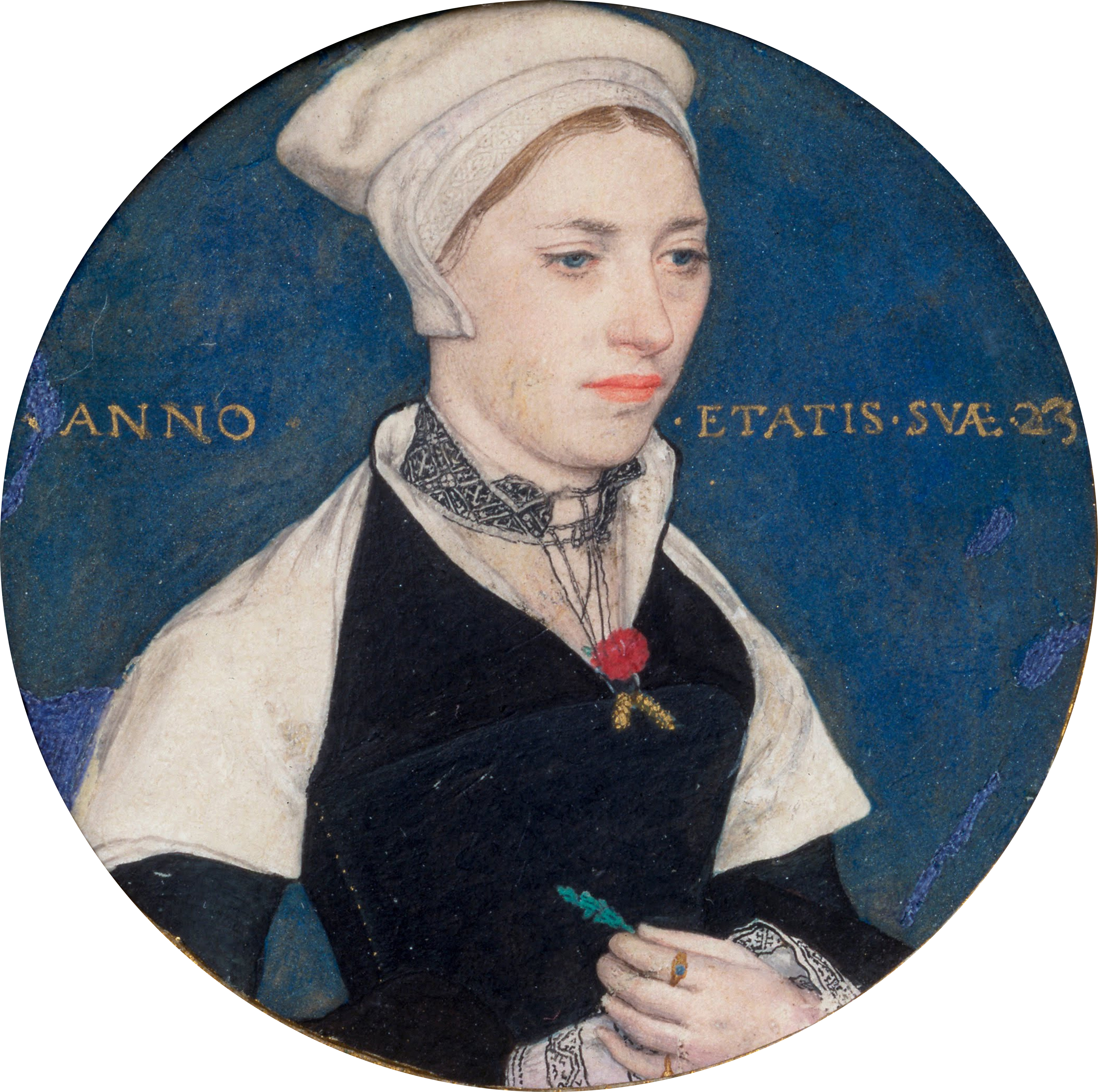
Portrait of Jane Small, c. 1540, by Hans Holbein the Younger, V&A Museum no. P.40&A-1935

Jane Small (c. 1518–1602) was a daughter of Christopher Pemberton, a Northamptonshire gentleman. She is well known as the subject of a portrait miniature by the famous 16th-century German artist Hans Holbein the Younger, painted about 1540. Holbein was known as a painter of the English court, where his paintings included those of King Henry VIII and several of his wives.

== Life ==
Jane Pemberton married Nicholas Small, a London cloth merchant, probably in about 1540. It is around this time that the Holbein portrait was commissioned. Nicholas Small died in the winter of 1565/66, and Jane remarried within the year, to Nicholas Parkinson. Her new husband went on to be Master of the Cloth workers' Company in 1578/79. Parkinson died in the winter of 1581/82. At this time Jane was living in Paddington, in the rectory, a house big enough to have been let to Sir John Popham, the attorney general, in the 1580s. Jane also held a lease on 'The Hand', a property on Thames Street, alongside the River Thames in London. In later life, she lived with her daughters and preferred to be addressed as Jane Small. She died in May 1602 whilst staying with her granddaughter in Warwickshire, but her burial place is unknown.

== Family ==
Jane Small had six children by Nicholas Small. After her second husband died intestate, her eldest son, Matthew Small, inherited, but only after a court hearing before the Star Chamber. A younger daughter, Elizabeth, married Jasper More of Shropshire. Jane's granddaughter, Katherine More, was at the centre of a bizarre incident that occurred between her and her husband Samuel More from about 1616 to 1620. During this time, her husband accused Katherine of having engaged in adultery with a long-time lover and giving birth to four children by him. Numerous court cases culminated in 1620 with Samuel More placing the four children with Pilgrims on the Mayflower just prior to its sailing for America. Soon after the Mayflower's arrival in America, three of the four children died. Only Katherine's son Richard More survived.

== Holbein portrait ==
Jane Small's historical significance derives from a fine portrait miniature by Hans Holbein the Younger. She has been identified as the subject from the coat of arms painted on a separate piece of vellum at the back of the miniature, that of Robert Pemberton of Lancashire and of Rushden, Northamptonshire, who died in 1594. The arms are dated 1566 but were painted in the 17th century. Scholars at first supposed that the sitter was Margaret Throckmorton (d. 1576), Robert Pemberton's wife, who had connections with the royal court. More recently, Jane Small has been established as the sitter.

The simplicity of the sitter's dress reflects her relatively modest status; most of the Englishwomen Holbein painted were attached to the court. The inscription records the sitter as in her 23rd year, but the date of the painting is not known for certain. It has been suggested that the portrait may have been commissioned to mark her engagement. She is shown wearing a carnation, which may symbolise her betrothal, and holding a leaf or sprig. Holbein's portrait, with its rich blue background, crisp outlines, and absence of shading, follows the conventions of the genre. Such miniatures were worn like a jewel.

In his last years, Holbein raised the art of the portrait miniature to its first peak of brilliance. His large pictures had always contained a miniature-like precision. He applied this skill to the smaller form, somehow retaining his monumentality of effect. His miniature portrait of Jane Small is considered a masterpiece of the genre. In the view of art historian Graham Reynolds:

[Holbein] portrays a young woman whose plainness is scarcely relieved by her simple costume of black-and-white materials, and yet there can be no doubt that this is one of the great portraits of the world. With remarkable objectivity Holbein has not added anything of himself or subtracted from his sitter's image; he has seen her as she appeared in a solemn mood in the cold light of his painting-room.

== See also ==
- List of paintings by Hans Holbein the Younger
- Katherine More, Jane Small's granddaughter
