= Portrait of Sir Richard Southwell =

Painting by Hans Holbein the Younger

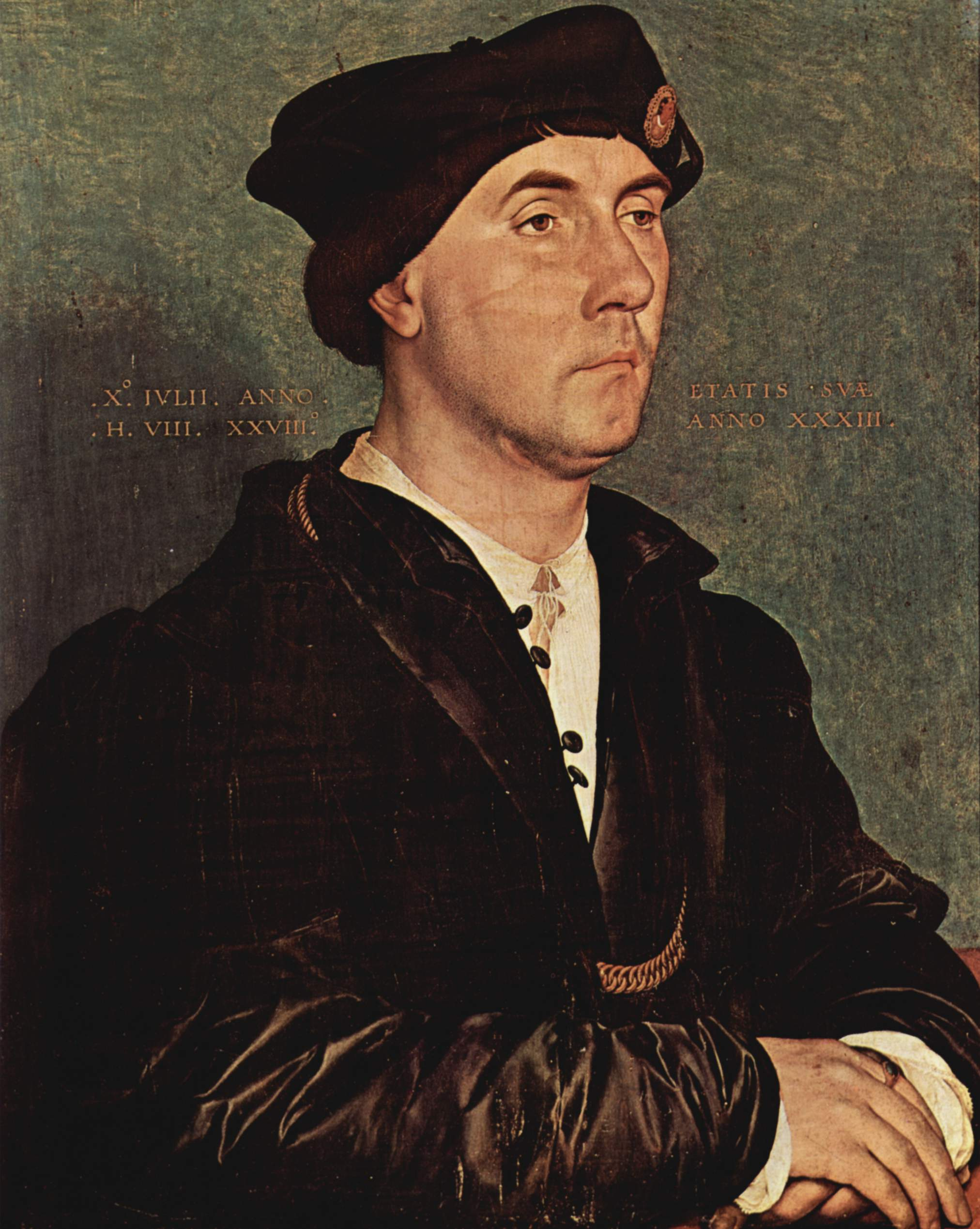
- Artist: Hans Holbein the Younger
- Year: 1536
- Type: Oil and tempera on oak
- Dimensions: 47.5 cm × 38 cm (18.7 in × 15 in)
- Location: Uffizi, Florence

The Portrait of Sir Richard Southwell is a painting by the German Renaissance master Hans Holbein the Younger, executed around 1536–1537. It is housed in the Uffizi, Florence.

The painting was required by Grand Duke Cosimo II de' Medici in 1620 to Thomas Howard, Duke of Arundel, to fill a gap in the family collections. It arrived in Florence in April 1621, when Cosimo had already died. It belongs to Holbein's mature career, and a preparatory drawing of the painting (with the inscription "Southwell Knight") exists in the Royal Collections of the Windsor Castle. The Louvre houses a copy brought to Paris during the Napoleonic Wars.

== Description ==
Richard Southwell was a privy councillor of King Henry VIII and was portrayed by Holbein, who had become court painter a short time before, in 1536, as recorded in the inscription. The latter reads:

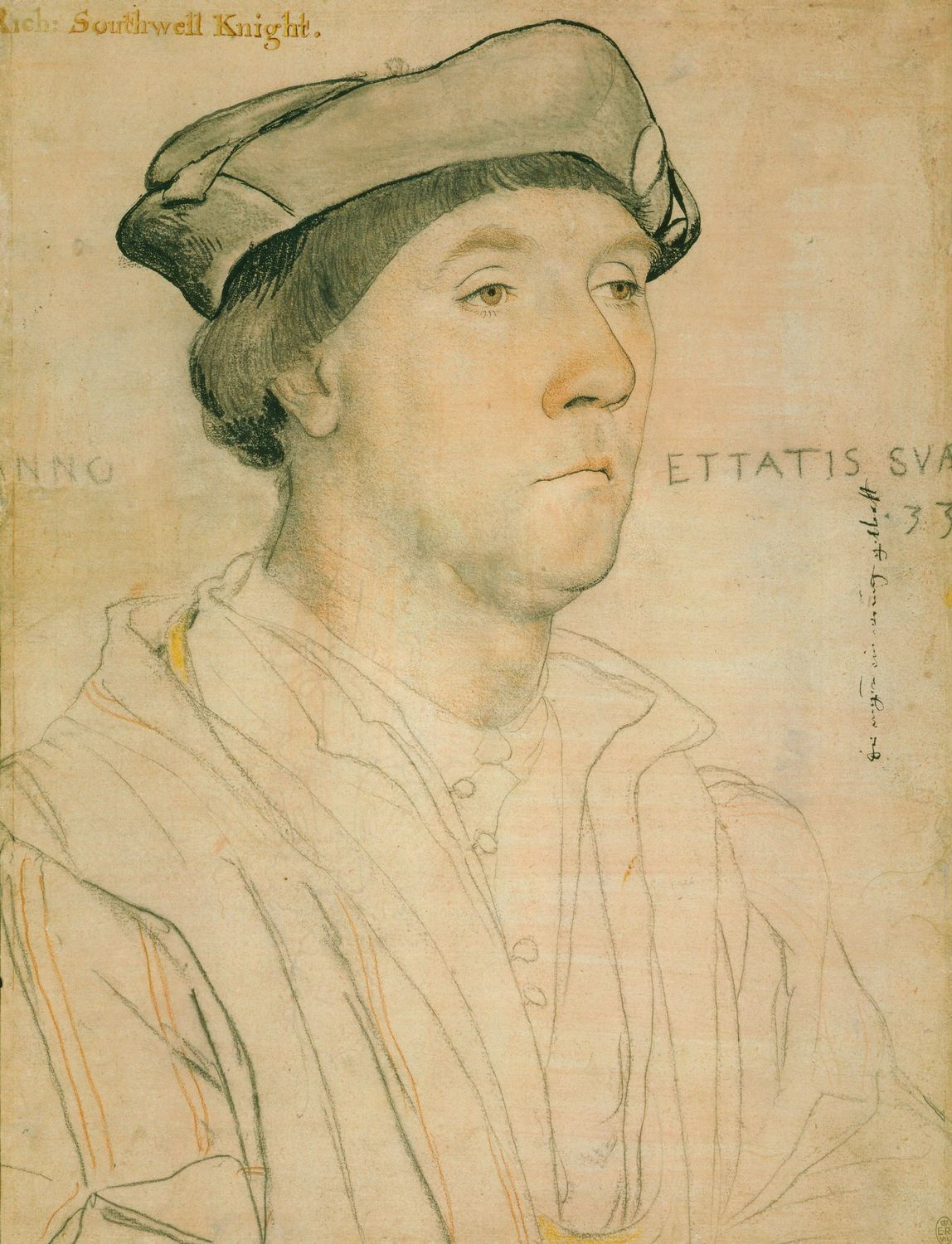
Preparatory drawing.

X° IVLII ANNO H[ENRICI] VIII XXVIII° / ETATIS SUAE ANNO XXXIII

The painting had once an ebony frame, of which only the silver decorative medallions remain, with the coats of arms of the Medici, Arundel, Southwell and the painter's name. They date likely to the acquisition by the Tuscan Grand Duke in the 17th century.

== See also ==
- List of paintings by Hans Holbein the Younger

== Sources ==
- Fossi, Gloria (2004). Uffizi. Florence: Giunti. ISBN 88-09-03675-1.
