= Jakob Meyer zum Hasen =

German bürgermeister (1482–1531)

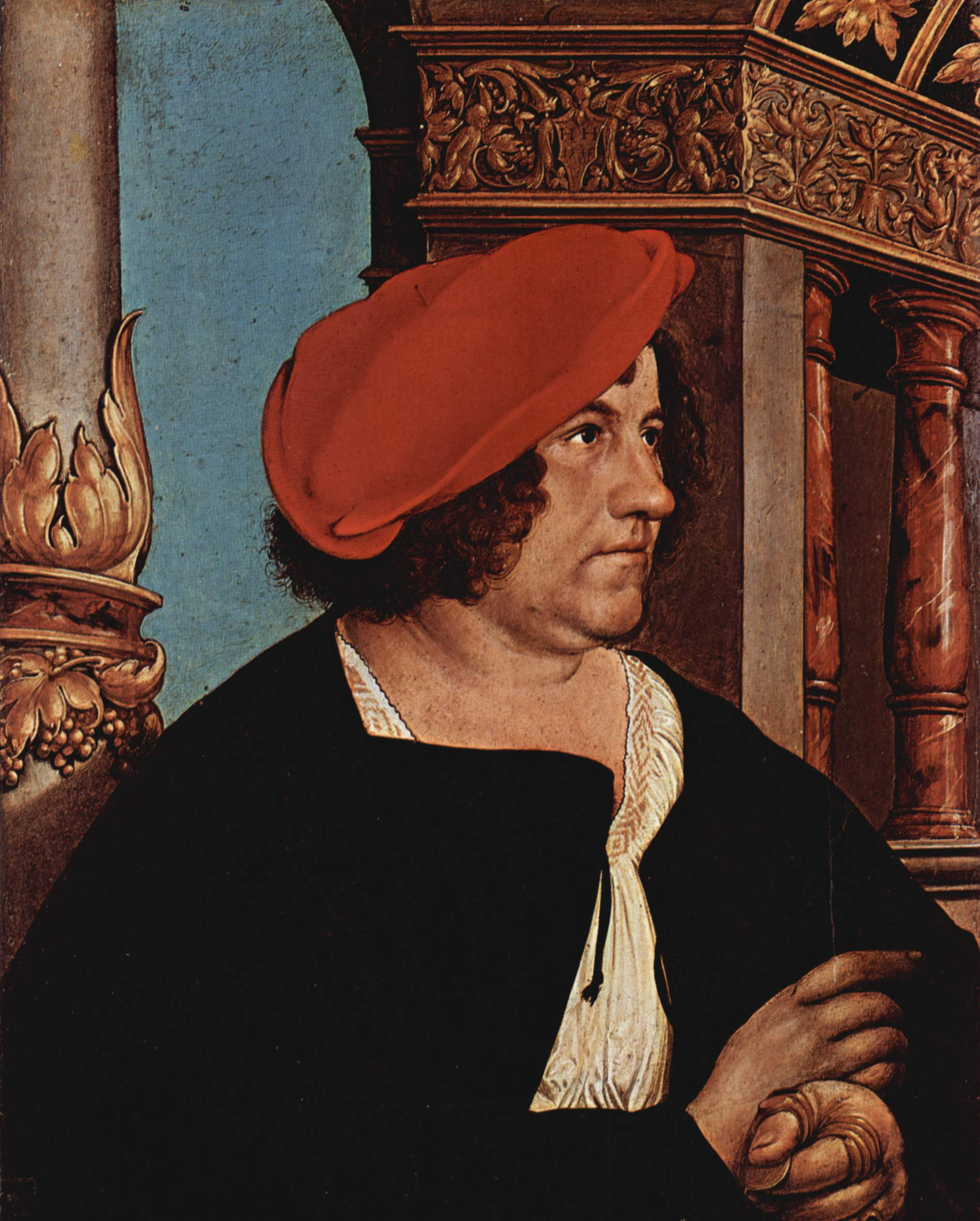
Hans Holbein the Younger, Jakob Meyer zum Hasen (1516), left panel of a double portrait with Dorothea Kannengiesser. Oil on wood, each panel 38.5 × 31 cm, Kunstmuseum Basel, Inv. Nr. 312

Jakob Meyer zum Hasen (1482 in Basel – 1531 in Freiburg im Breisgau) was the bürgermeister of the city of Basel from 1516 to 1521. A money changer by profession, he was the first bürgermeister of Basel to be a tradesman, belonging to a guild rather than a member of the aristocracy or a wealthy family. He is known as a patron of the painter Hans Holbein the Younger, having commissioned the Darmstadt Madonna and a double portrait from him.

== Biography ==
He was born in Basel as the son of a merchant. He used to change money in the House "To the Rabbit" (dt. Zum Hasen), which was situated at the location of the tower of the current town hall. From 1503 onwards he was accepted as a member of several guilds, such as the guild of the Hausgenossen (money changers), then also the guild of the wine merchants and then that of the locksmiths. By 1508 he was so rich that he purchased the Castle of Gross Gundeldingen in the suburbs of Basel. From 1510 and 1515 he was the Master of the Guild zu Hausgenossen. In 1515, the Grand Council of Basel cancelled the tradition according to which the mayor had to be of the local aristocracy. and Meyer became, in 1516, the first mayor from a trade background. In the same year, he commissioned a double portrait with his second wife Dorothea Kannengießer from Hans Holbein the Younger. As the mayor of Basel, he sacked the castle of Pfeffingen. He remained the mayor of Basel until 1521, the year he was accused of receiving secret pensions from France. Von Hasen and six other grand councilors accused alongside him were expelled from the Grand Council following which he was imprisoned. After his release he was reinstated on the Grand Council after the charges were dropped, where he was a member of the council's pro-Catholic faction at a time of increased religious strife. In later years he went into voluntary exile to Freiburg im Breisgau, where he died in 1531.

== Military career ==
In his twenties he was a member of the Swiss soldiers in service of the French, Italian or Papal nobility which was a lucrative business at the time. In 1507 he joined Amboise to reconquer Genoa. Later in his foreign military service, he often changed sides. First he fought for France, then for Pope Julius II against France. In 1510 he served Matthäus Schiner in Ferrara. He led a contingent of Basler warriors in the conquest of Milan in 1512 and the same year was also the leader of the Swiss emissaries who instated Maximilian Sforza as the Duke of Milan.

== Personal life ==
He was married twice and his grandchild Rosa Irmi would marry Remigius Faesch, another mayor of Basel.
