= Self-portrait (Hans Holbein the Younger) =

By Hans Hobein the Younger in the Uffizi

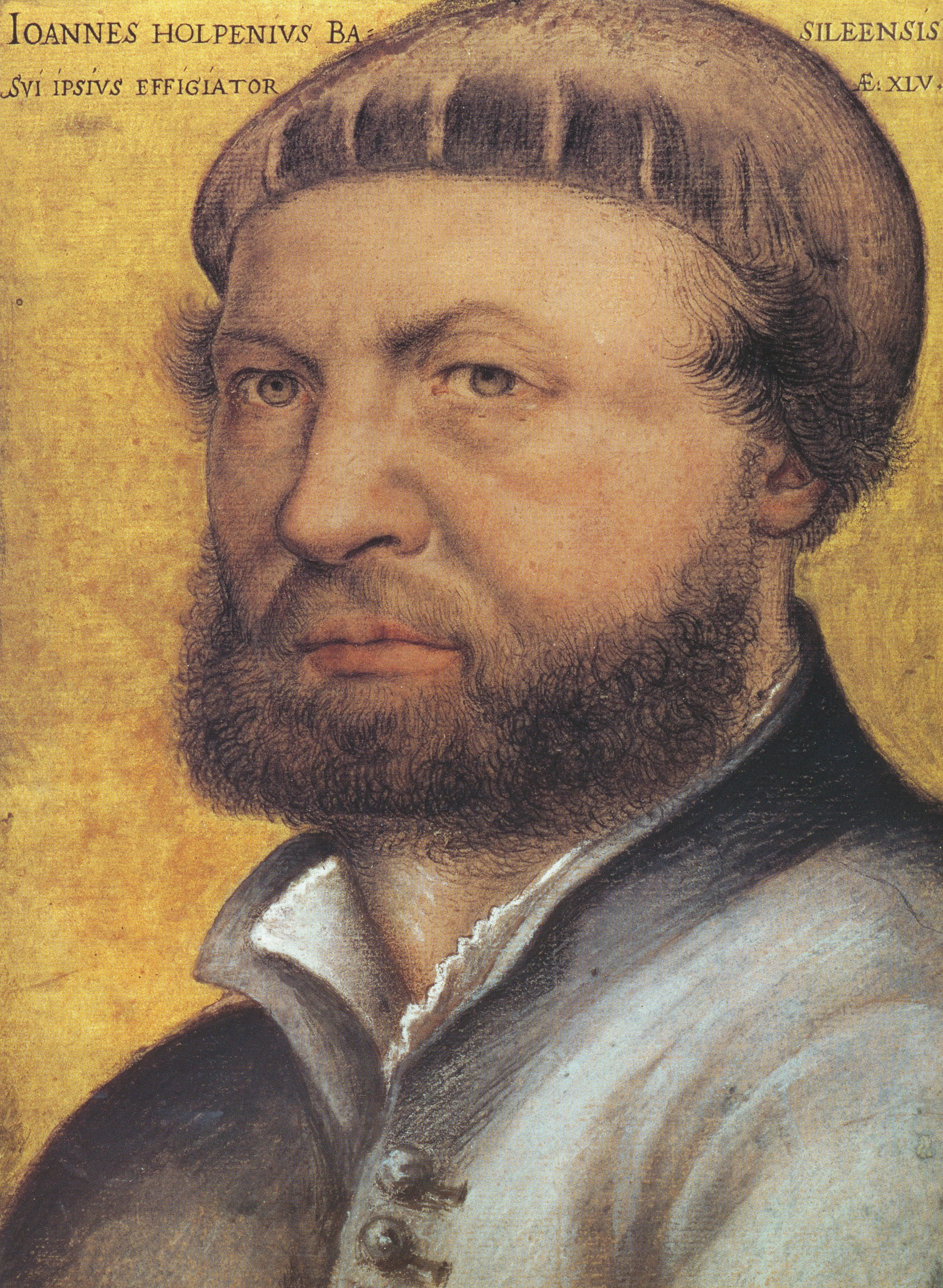
Self-portrait, c. 1542–1543. Coloured chalks and pen on paper, 32 x 26cm. Uffizi, Florence

The Self-portrait is a small drawing by the German Renaissance artist and printmaker Hans Holbein the Younger, completed around 1542–1543, and housed in the Uffizi, Florence. The gold background was added later by a different artist. According to art historian John Rowlands, "Although this drawing has been enlarged on all sides and heavily reworked, enough of it still shows to allow the assumption that the original work was executed by Holbein. The inscription, also a later addition, evidently records an even earlier one, of which slight traces remain.

Copies of the drawing exist, including one by Lucas Horenbout, in which the left-handed Holbein is holding a paintbrush. Art historian Stephanie Buck notes that Holbein's direct gaze suggests he was looking into a mirror. Holbein died not long after completing this self-portrait, probably of the plague.

The work was acquired in London for Gran Duke Cosimo III de' Medici in 1681. As in other works by Holbein, there is much attention given to details, such as the hair strands, which were painted one-by-one.

== See also ==
- List of paintings by Hans Holbein the Younger
