= Leopold Hirsch =

Leopold Hirsch (1857–1932) was a Grand Duchy of Hesse-born financier and art collector in London.

== Life ==
Hirsch was born at Heppenheim, Grand Duchy of Hesse, in 1857 to German Jewish parents, Baruch and Nina Hirsch. Shortly after leaving the Grand Duchy of Hesse and arriving in London, Hirsch was employed as a broker by Sir Julius Wernher. He arrived in London with only £5 and had made a fortune by his death in 1932.

As a successful financier and art collector, he became part of the British establishment. He lived at 10 Kensington Palace Gardens in central London. His funeral was held at the Jewish Cemetery, Willesden.
