= Basel =

City in Switzerland

Basel Basle
- Municipality
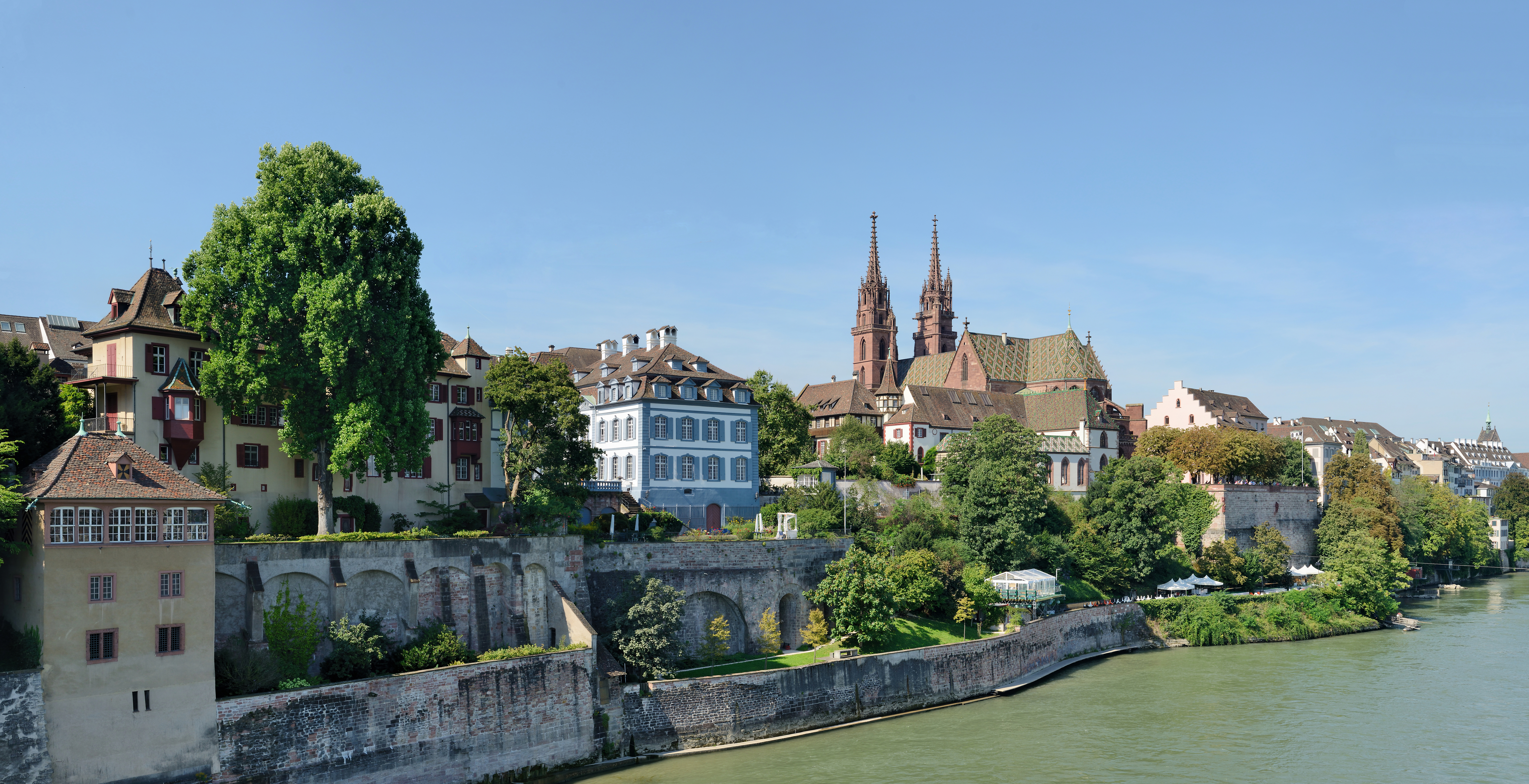
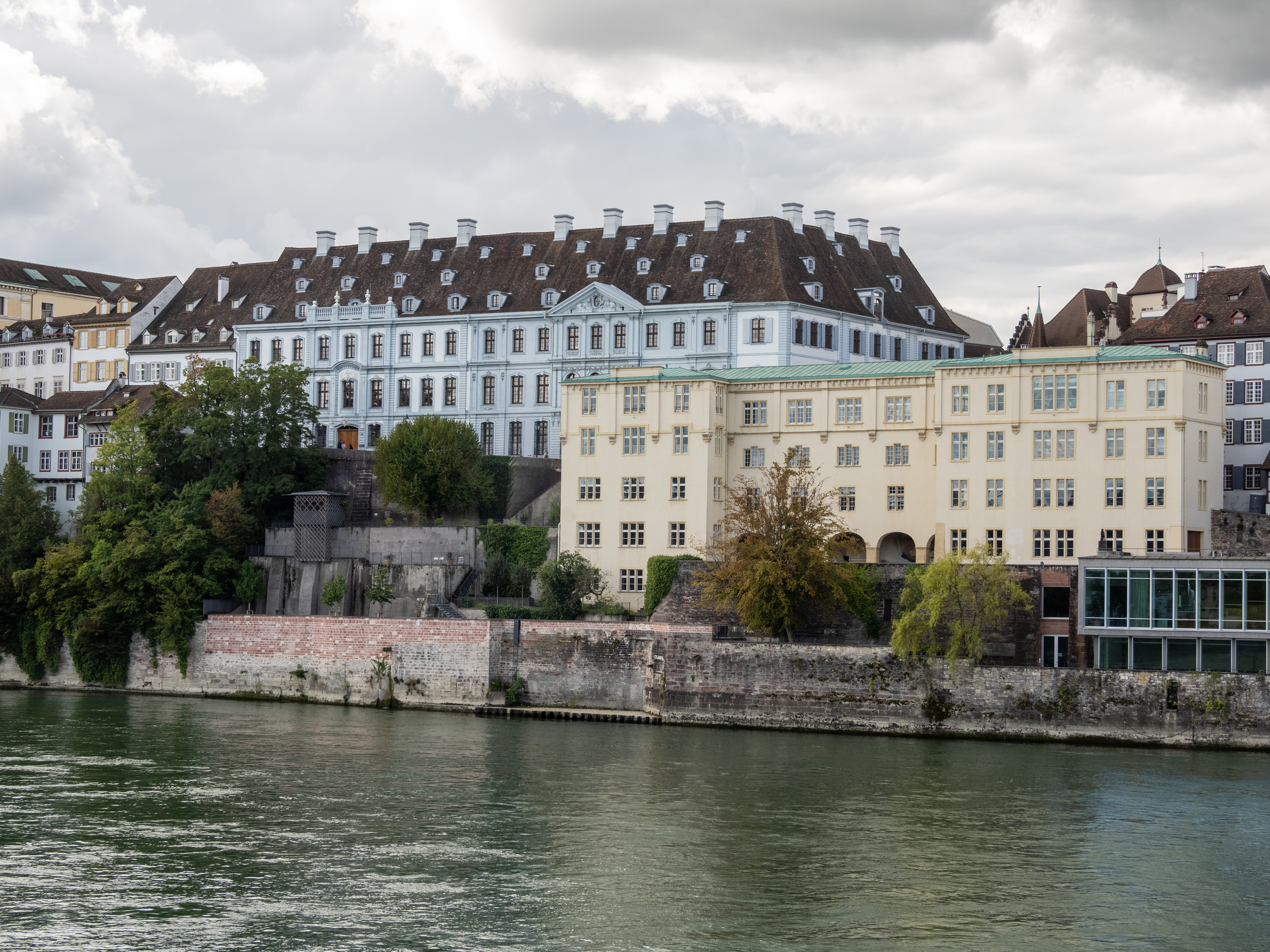
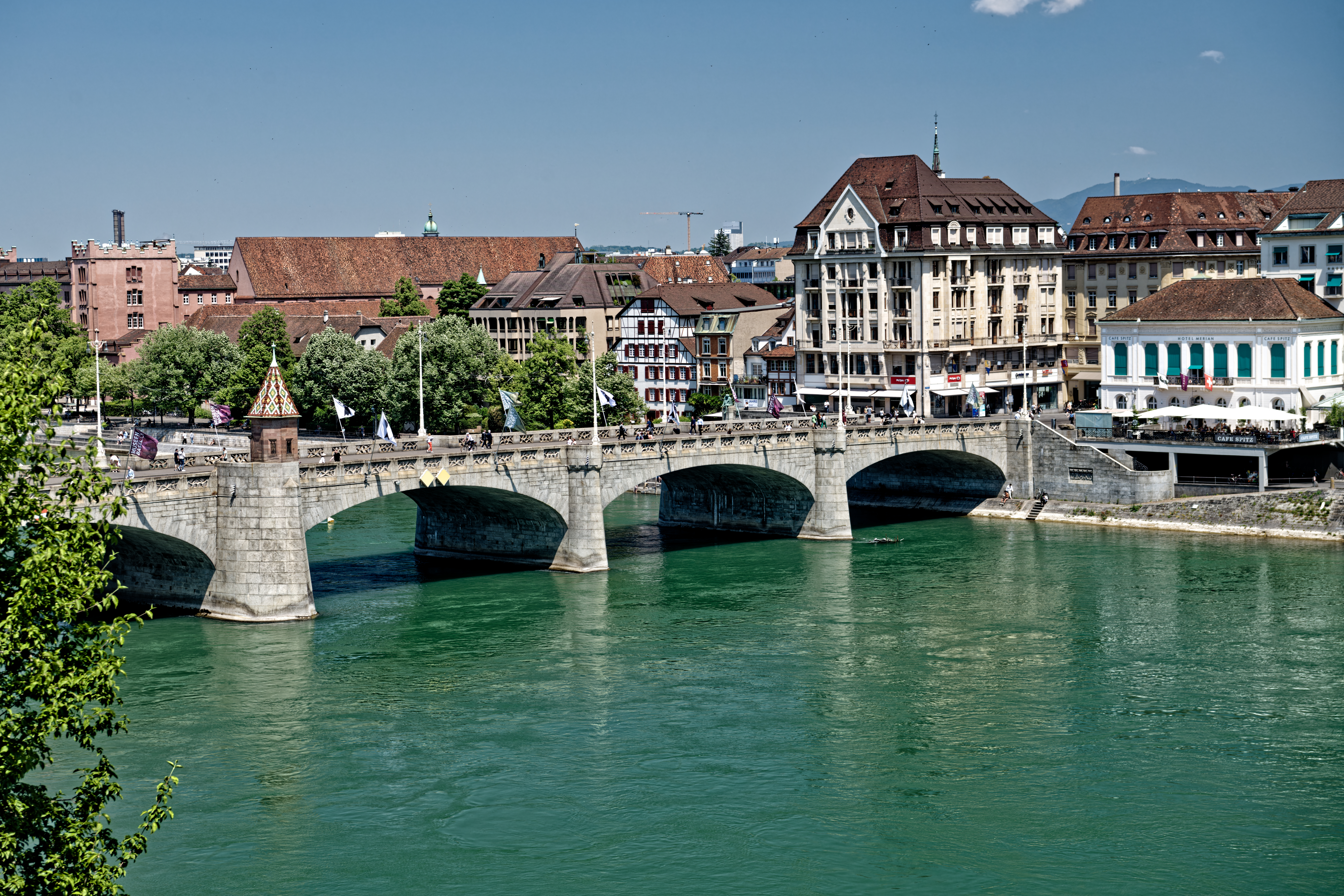
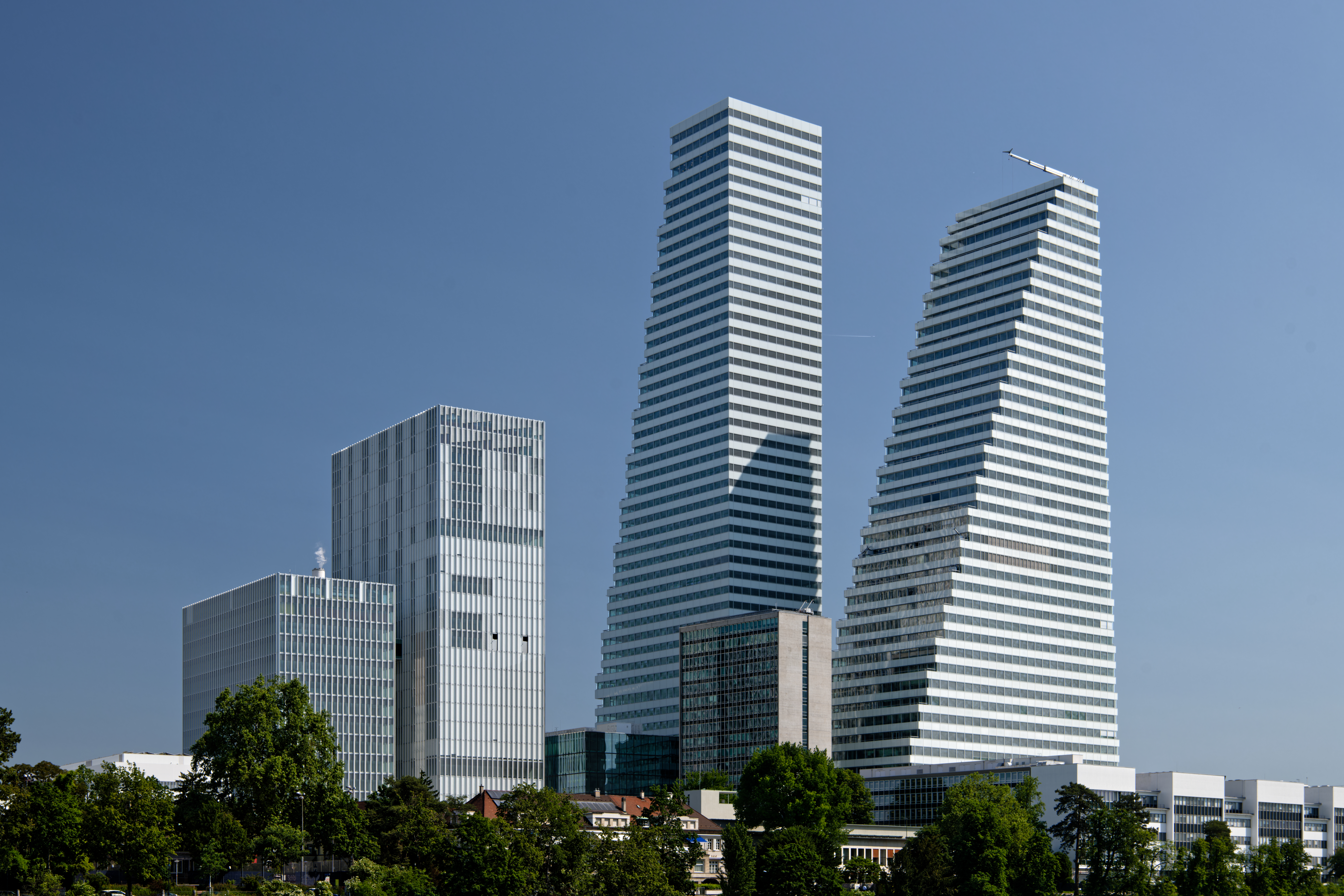
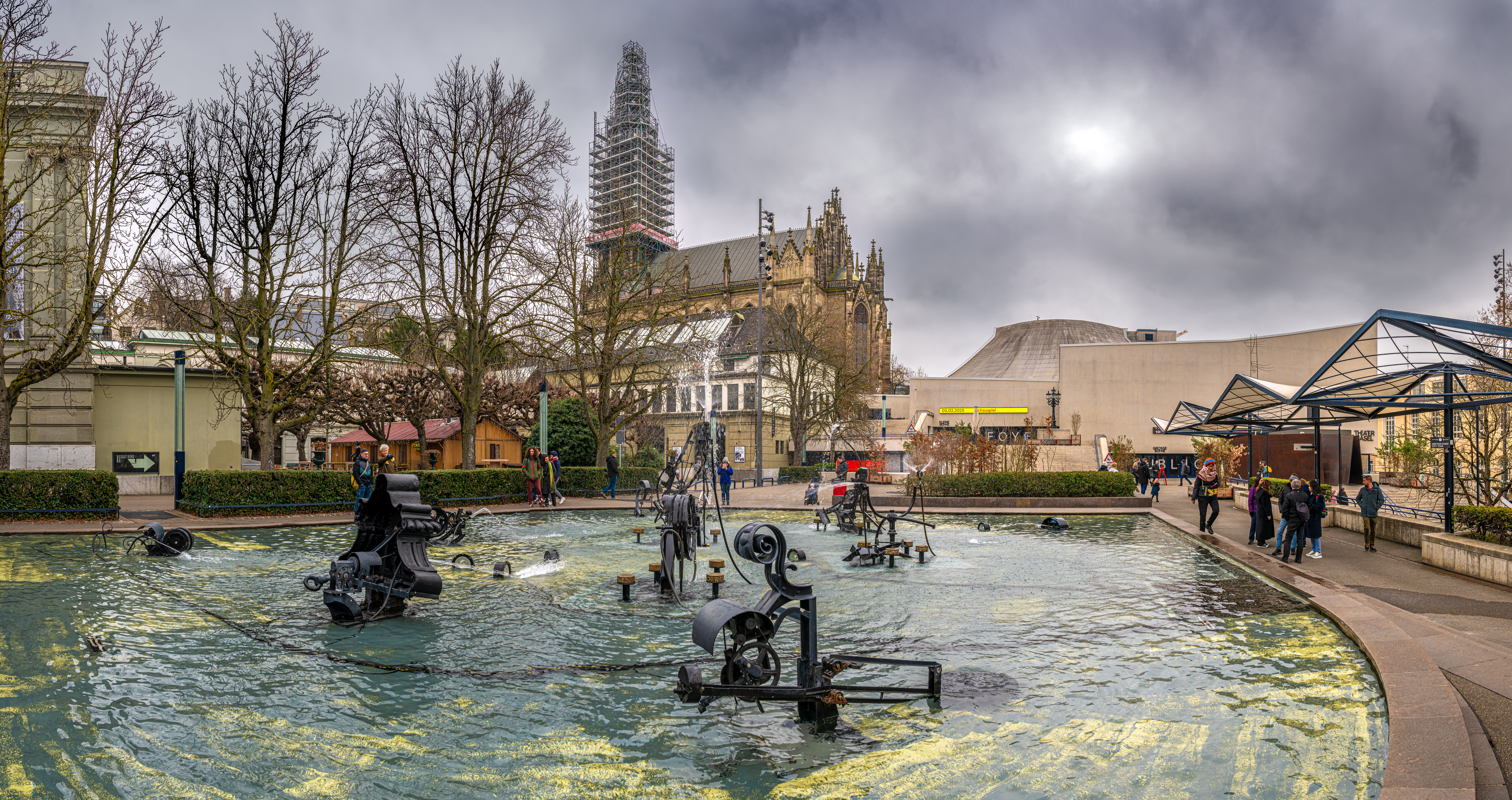
- River Rhine with Basel Minster in background University of Basel Middle Bridge Roche Tower Elisabethenkirche

- Flag Coat of arms
- Location of Basel
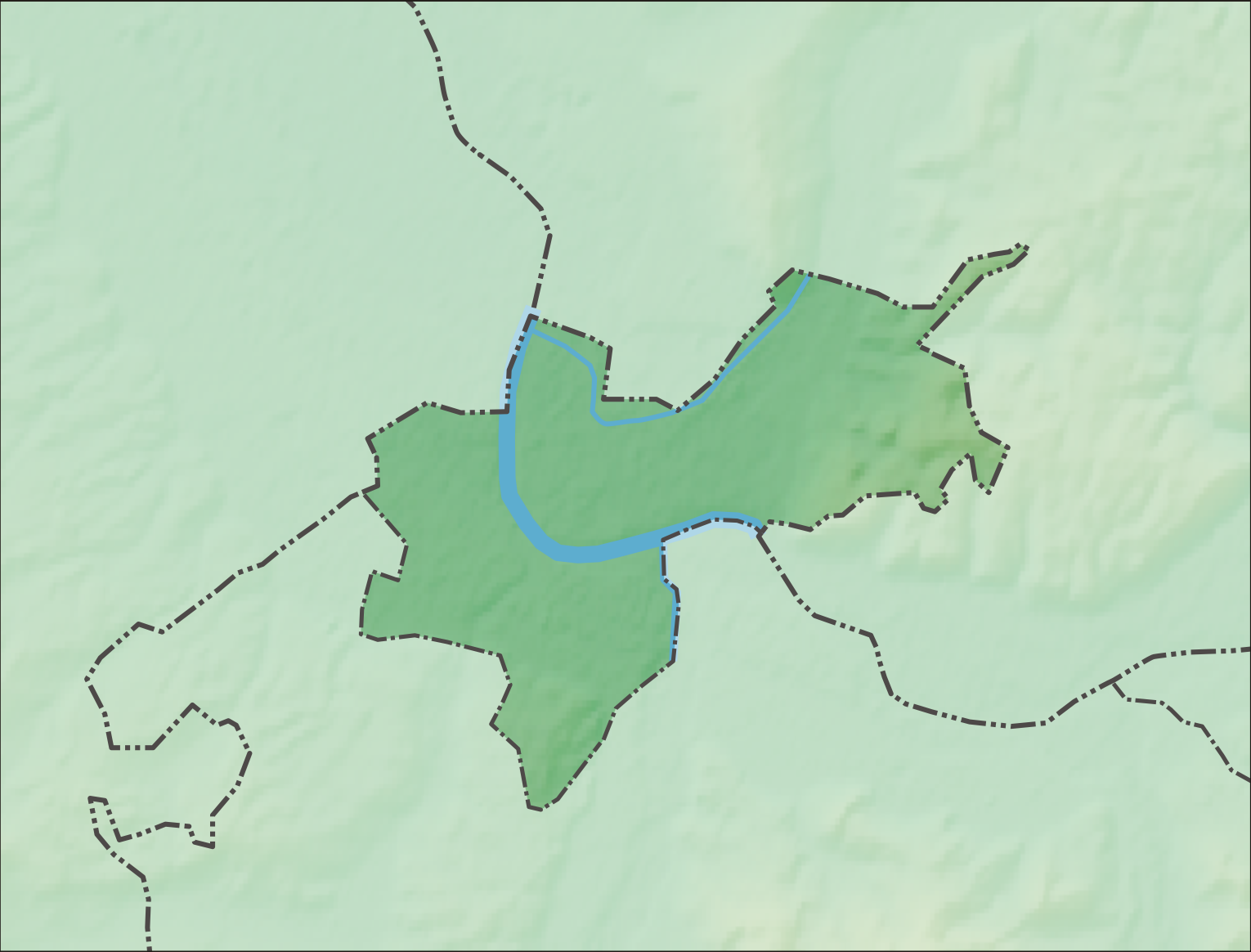
- Location within Switzerland Location within Canton of Basel-Stadt
- Coordinates: 47°33′29″N 7°35′16″E
- Country: Switzerland
- Canton: Basel-Stadt

Government
  - Executive: Regierungsrat with 7 members
  - Parliament: Grosser Rat with 100 members

Area
  - Total: 22.75 km^{2} (8.78 sq mi)
- Elevation (Barfüsserkirche): 261 m (856 ft)
- Highest elevation (Wasserturm Bruderholz): 366 m (1,201 ft)
- Lowest elevation (Rhine shore, national border at Kleinhüningen): 244.75 m (803.0 ft)

Population (2024-12-31)
  - Total: 177,595 (city municipality); 830,000 (metropolitan area)
  - Rank: 3rd
  - Density: 7,806/km^{2} (20,220/sq mi)
- Demonyms: German: Basler(in), French: Bâlois(e), Italian: Basilese, Romansh: Basilean(a)
- Time zone: UTC+01:00 (CET)
  - Summer (DST): UTC+02:00 (CEST)
- Postal code: 4000
- SFOS number: 2701
- ISO 3166 code: CH-BS
- Surrounded by: Allschwil (BL), Hégenheim (FR-68), Binningen (BL), Birsfelden (BL), Bottmingen (BL), Huningue (FR-68), Münchenstein (BL), Muttenz (BL), Reinach (BL), Riehen (BS), Saint-Louis (FR-68), Weil am Rhein (DE-BW), Grenzach-Wyhlen (DE-BW)
- Website: bs.ch

Basel (Note: /ˈbɑːzəl/ BAH-zəl; German: [ˈbaːzl̩]. Also known as Basle (English: /bɑːl/ BAHL), French: Bâle [bɑl]; Italian: Basilea [baziˈlɛːa]; Romansh: Basilea [baziˈleːɐ]; Sutsilvan: Basileia.) or Basle is a city in northwestern Switzerland on the river Rhine, at the transition from the High Rhine to the Upper Rhine. Basel is Switzerland's third most populous city (after Zurich and Geneva), with 177,595 inhabitants within the city municipality limits.

Basel is commonly considered to be the cultural capital of Switzerland and the city's museums include the Kunstmuseum, which was the first collection of art accessible to the public in the world (1661) and the largest museum of art in Switzerland, the Fondation Beyeler (located in Riehen), the Museum Tinguely and the Museum of Contemporary Art, which was the first public museum of contemporary art in Europe. Forty museums are spread throughout the canton, making Basel one of the largest cultural centres in relation to its size and population in Europe. It is the hometown of the Art Basel international art fair, showcasing modern and contemporary works from leading galleries and attracting top collectors, artists, and enthusiasts globally.

The University of Basel, Switzerland's oldest university (founded in 1460), and the city's centuries-long commitment to humanism, have made Basel a safe haven at times of political unrest in other parts of Europe for such notable people as Erasmus of Rotterdam, the Holbein family, Friedrich Nietzsche, Carl Jung, and in the 20th century also Hermann Hesse and Karl Jaspers.

Basel was the seat of a Prince-Bishopric starting in the 11th century, and joined the Swiss Confederacy in 1501. The city has been a commercial hub and an important cultural centre since the Renaissance, and has emerged as a centre for the chemical and pharmaceutical industries in the 20th century. In 1897, Basel was chosen by Theodor Herzl as the location for the first World Zionist Congress, and altogether the congress was held there ten times over a time span of 50 years, more than in any other location. The city is also home to the world headquarters of the Bank for International Settlements.

Other notable institutions in Basel include the Basel Committee on Banking Supervision, which published banking standards such as Basel III; Art Basel; and FC Basel.

Basel is Switzerland's main centre for the pharmaceutical industry, hosting both Novartis and Roche. In 1938, the world-renowned chemist Albert Hofmann discovered LSD in Basel, where he spent most of his life. The discovery is celebrated internationally as Bicycle Day. Other influential and renowned figures such as Roger Federer, Paracelsus, Matthäus Merian, Michel von Tell and Stephan Remmler are closely associated with the city or were born there. In 1734, the so-called "Basel Problem" was solved in the city, which is regarded as one of the most important achievements in mathematics.

Basel was ranked the tenth most liveable city in the world by Mercer in 2019.

== Name ==
The name of Basel is first recorded as Basilia in the 3rd century (237/238), at the time referring to the Roman castle. This name is mostly interpreted as deriving from the personal name Basilius, from a toponym villa Basilia ("estate of Basilius") or similar.

Another suggestion derives it from a name Basilia attested in northern France as a development of basilica, the term for a public or church building (as in Bazeilles), but all of these names reference early church buildings of the 4th or 5th century and cannot be adduced for the 3rd century attestation of Basilia.

By popular etymology, or simple assonance, the basilisk becomes closely associated with the city, used as heraldic supporter from 1448, represented on coins minted by the city, and frequently found in ornaments.

The Middle French form Basle was adopted into English, but this form has fallen gradually out of use although it continues to be used with the modern French pronunciation in some sections of British English, at least informally. Currently, the spelling Basel is most often used, to match the official German spelling. In French Basle was still in use in the 18th century, but was gradually replaced by the modern French spelling Bâle. In Icelandic, the city is recorded as Buslaraborg in the 12th century itinerary Leiðarvísir og borgarskipan.

== History ==
=== Early history ===
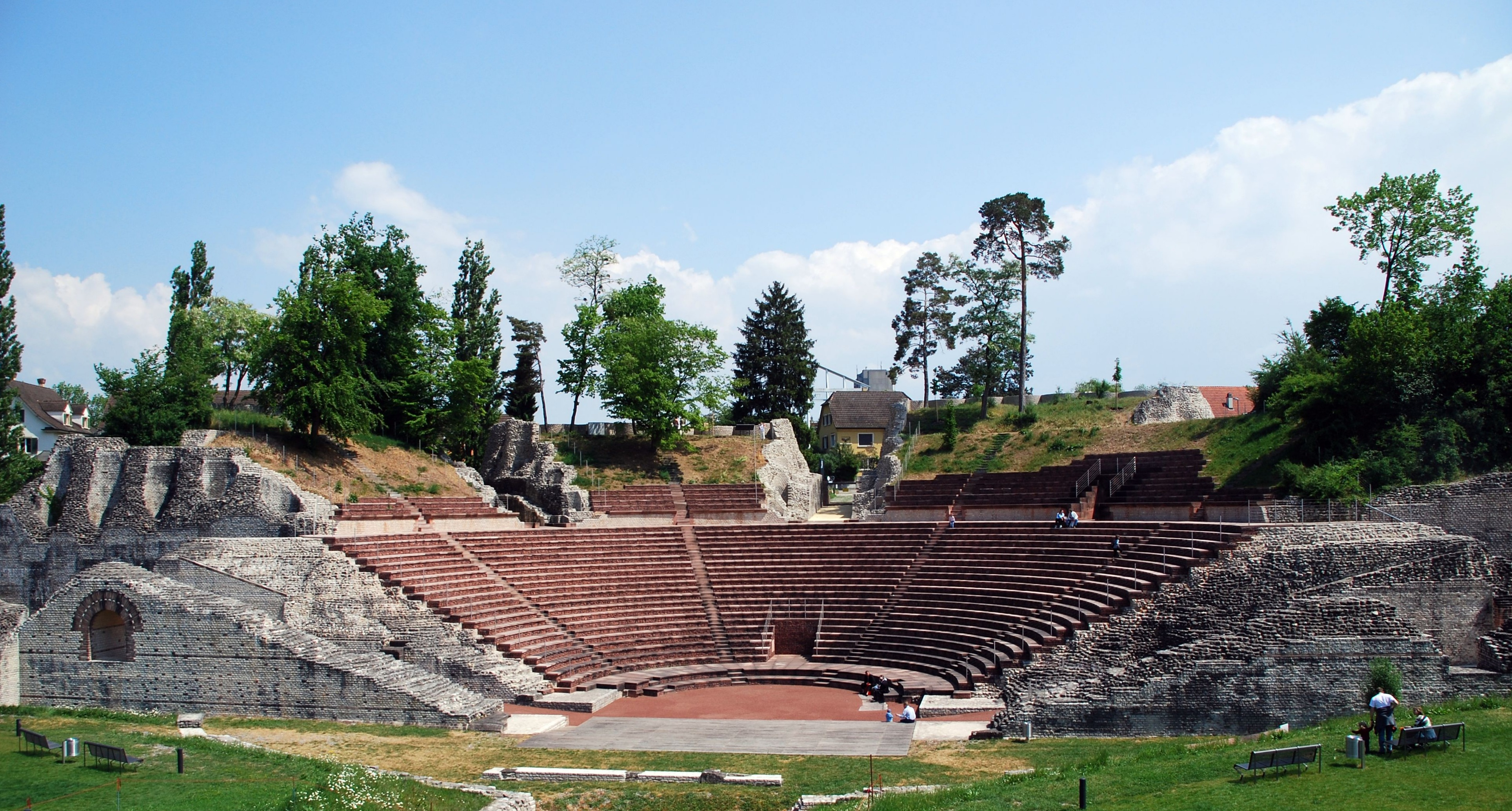
The Roman theatre in Augusta Raurica, one of the most important Roman archaeological sites in Switzerland

There are traces of a settlement at the nearby Rhine knee from the early La Tène period (5th century BC). In the 2nd century BC, there was a village of the Raurici at the site of Basel-Gasfabrik (to the northwest of the Old City, and likely identical with the town of Arialbinnum that was mentioned on the Tabula Peutingeriana). The unfortified settlement was abandoned in the 1st century BC in favour of an oppidum on the site of Basel Minster, probably in reaction to the Roman invasion of Gaul.

In Roman Gaul, Augusta Raurica was established some 20 km (12 mi) from Basel as the regional administrative centre, while a castrum (fortified camp) was built on the site of the Celtic oppidum. In AD 83, the area was incorporated into the Roman province of Germania Superior. The Roman Senator Munatius Plancus is known as the traditional founder of Basel since the Renaissance. Roman control over the area deteriorated in the 3rd century, and Basel became an outpost of the Provincia Maxima Sequanorum formed by Diocletian. Basilia is first named by the Ammianus Marcellinus in his Res Gestae as part of the Roman military fortifications along the Rhine in the late 4th century.

The Germanic confederation of the Alemanni attempted to cross the Rhine several times in the 4th century, but were repelled; one such event was the Battle of Solicinium (368). However, in the great invasion of AD 406, the Alemanni appear to have crossed the Rhine a final time, conquering and then settling what is today Alsace and a large part of the Swiss Plateau.

The Duchy of Alemannia fell under Frankish rule in the 6th century. The Alemannic and Frankish settlement of Basel gradually grew around the old Roman castle in the 6th and 7th century. It appears that Basel surpassed the ancient regional capital of Augusta Raurica by the 7th century; based on the evidence of a gold tremissis (a small gold coin with the value of a third of a solidus) with the inscription Basilia fit, Basel seems to have minted its own coins in the 7th century.

Basel at this time was part of the Archdiocese of Besançon. A separate bishopric of Basel, replacing the ancient bishopric of Augusta Raurica, was established in the 8th century. Under bishop Haito (r. 806–823), the first cathedral was built on the site of the Roman castle (replaced by a Romanesque structure consecrated in 1019).

At the partition of the Carolingian Empire through the Treaty of Verdun in 843, Basel was first given to West Francia and became its German exclave. It passed to East Francia with the Treaty of Meerssen of 870. Basel was destroyed by the Magyars in 917. The rebuilt town became part of Upper Burgundy, and as such was incorporated into the Holy Roman Empire in 1032.

=== Prince-Bishopric of Basel ===
Basel Minster, built between 1019 and 1500

From the donation by Rudolph III of Burgundy of the Moutier-Grandval Abbey and all its possessions to Bishop Adalbero II of Metz in 999 until the Reformation, Basel was ruled by Prince-Bishops.

In 1019, the construction of the cathedral of Basel (known locally as the Münster) began under Henry II, Holy Roman Emperor.

In the 11th to 12th centuries, Basel gradually acquired the characteristics of a medieval city. The main market place is first mentioned in 1091. The first city walls were constructed around 1100 (with improvements made in the mid-13th and in the late 14th century). A city council of nobles and burghers is recorded for 1185, and the first mayor, Heinrich Steinlin of Murbach, for 1253. The first bridge across the Rhine was built in 1225 under bishop Heinrich von Thun (at the location of the modern Middle Bridge), and from this time the settlement of Kleinbasel gradually formed around the bridgehead on the far river bank. The bridge was largely funded by Basel's Jewish community who had settled there a century earlier. For many centuries to come Basel possessed the only permanent bridge over the river "between Lake Constance and the sea". The first city craft guild was the furriers, established in 1226. A total of about fifteen guilds were established in the course of the 13th century, reflecting the increasing economic prosperity of the city. The Crusade of 1267 set out from Basel.

Political conflicts between the bishops and the burghers began in the mid-13th century and continued throughout the 14th century. By the late 14th century, the city was for all practical purposes independent although it continued to nominally pledge fealty to the bishops. The House of Habsburg attempted to gain control over the city. This was not successful, but it caused a political split among the burghers of Basel into a pro-Habsburg faction, known as Sterner, and an anti-Habsburg faction, the Psitticher.

The Black Death reached Basel in 1348. The Jews were blamed, and an estimated 50 to 70 Jews were executed by burning on 16 January 1349 in what has become known as the Basel massacre. The Basel earthquake of 1356 destroyed much of the city along with a number of castles in the vicinity.

A riot on 26 February 1376, known as Böse Fasnacht, led to the killing of a number of men of Leopold III, Duke of Austria. This was seen as a serious breach of the peace, and the city council blamed "foreign ruffians" for this and executed twelve alleged perpetrators. Leopold nevertheless had the city placed under imperial ban, and in a treaty of 9 July, Basel was given a heavy fine and was placed under Habsburg control. To free itself from Habsburg hegemony, Basel joined the Swabian League of Cities in 1385, and many knights of the pro-Habsburg faction, along with duke Leopold himself, were killed in the Battle of Sempach the following year. A formal treaty with Habsburg was made in 1393.

Basel had gained its de facto independence from both the bishop and from the Habsburgs and was free to pursue its own policy of territorial expansion, beginning around 1400.

The unique representation of a bishops' crozier as the heraldic charge in the coat of arms of Basel first appears in the form of a gilded wooden staff in the 12th century. It is of unknown origin or significance (beyond its obvious status of bishop's crozier), but it is assumed to have represented a relic, possibly attributed to Saint Germanus of Granfelden. This staff (known as Baselstab) became a symbol representing the Basel diocese, depicted in bishops' seals of the late medieval period. It is represented in a heraldic context in the early 14th century, not yet as a heraldic charge but as a kind of heraldic achievement flanked by the heraldic shields of the bishop. The staff is also represented in the bishops's seals of the period. The use of the Baselstab in black as the coat of arms of the city was introduced in 1385. From this time, the Baselstab in red represented the bishop, and the same charge in black represented the city. The blazon of the municipal coat of arms is In Silber ein schwarzer Baselstab (Argent, a staff of Basel sable). In 1400, Basel was able to purchase the towns of Liestal, Homburg and Waldenburg with its surrounding territory.

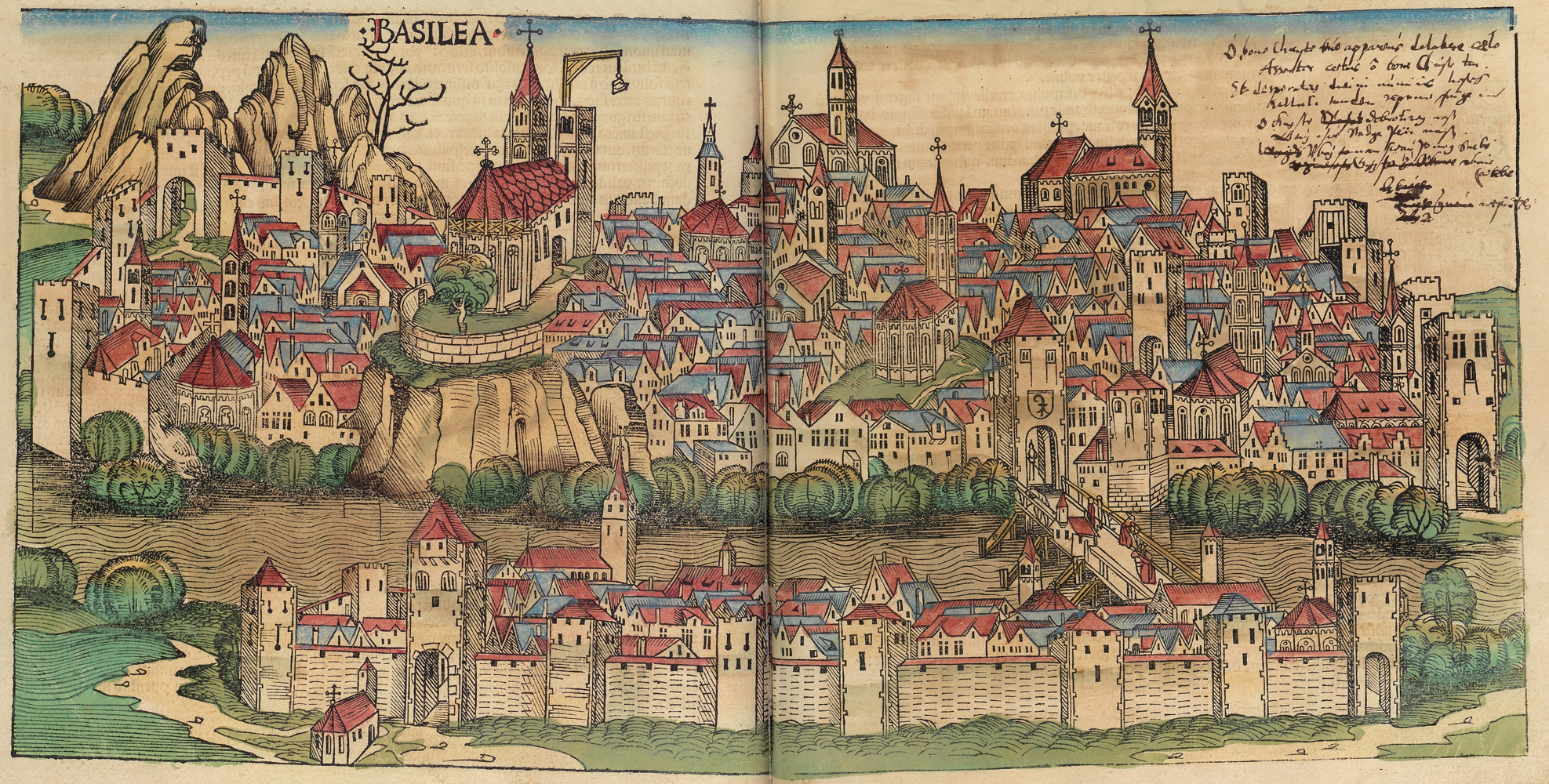
1493 woodcut of Basel, from the Nuremberg Chronicle

In 1412 (or earlier), the well-known Gasthof zum Goldenen Sternen was established. Basel became the focal point of western Christendom during the 15th century Council of Basel (1431–1449), including the 1439 election of antipope Felix V. In 1459, Pope Pius II endowed the University of Basel, where such notables as Erasmus of Rotterdam and Paracelsus later taught. At the same time the new craft of printing was introduced to Basel by apprentices of Johann Gutenberg. In 1461, the land around Farnsburg became a part of Basel.

The Schwabe publishing house was founded in 1488 by Johannes Petri and is the oldest publishing house still in business. Johann Froben also operated his printing house in Basel and was notable for publishing works by Erasmus. In 1495, Basel was incorporated into the Upper Rhenish Imperial Circle; the Bishop of Basel was added to the Bench of the Ecclesiastical Princes of the Imperial Diet. In 1500 the construction of the Basel Münster was finished.

=== As a member state in the Swiss Confederacy ===
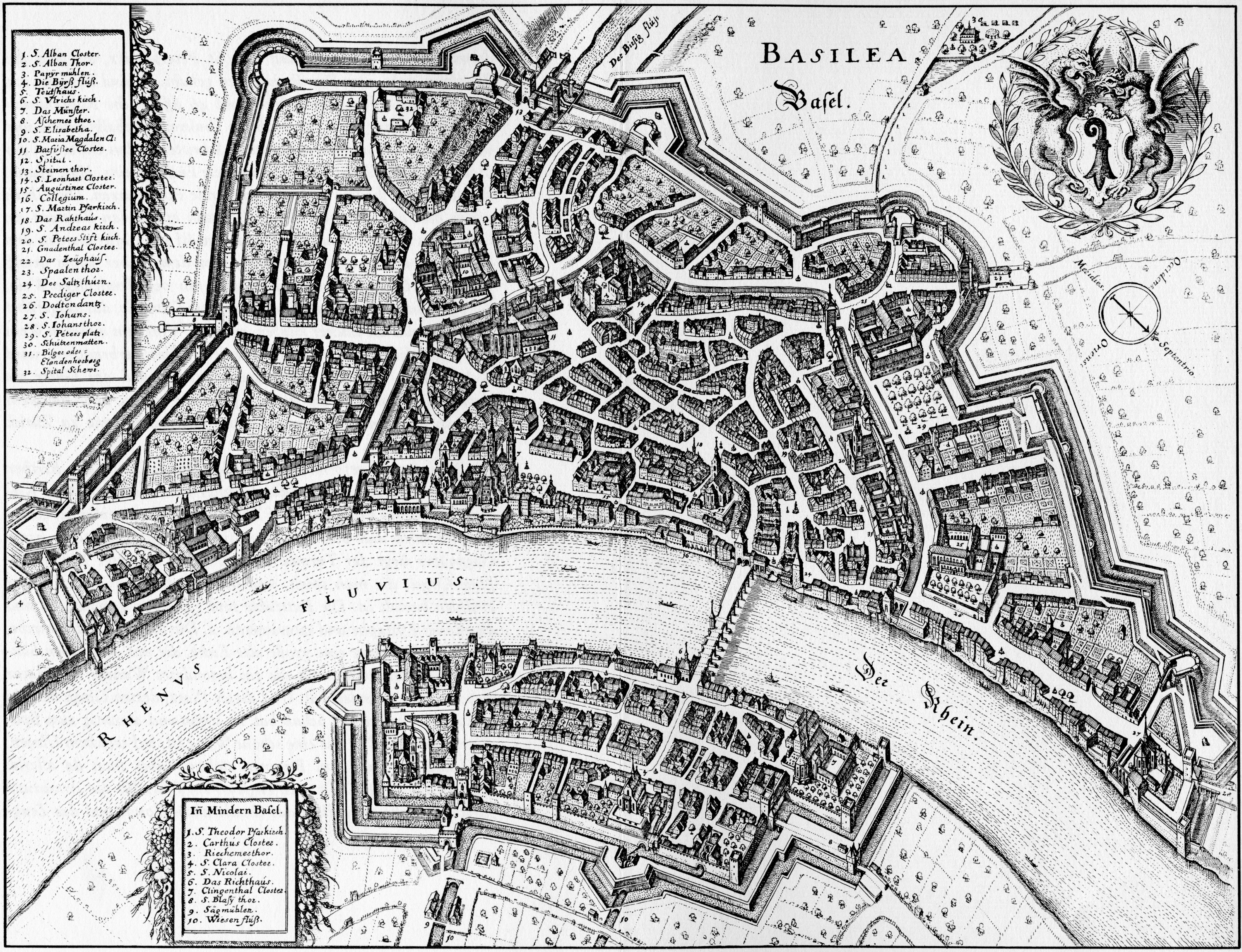
Map of Basel in 1642, engraved by Matthäus Merian, oriented with SW at the top and NE at the bottom

The city had remained neutral through the Swabian War of 1499 despite being plundered by soldiers on both sides. The Treaty of Basel ended the war and granted the Swiss confederates exemptions from the emperor Maximillian's taxes and jurisdictions, separating Switzerland de facto from the Holy Roman Empire.

On 9 June 1501, Basel joined the Swiss Confederation as its eleventh canton. It was the only canton that was asked to join, not the other way round. Basel had a strategic location, good relations with Strasbourg and Mulhouse, and control of the corn imports from Alsace, whereas the Swiss lands were becoming overpopulated and had few resources. A provision of the Charter accepting Basel required that in conflicts among the other cantons it was to stay neutral and offer its services for mediation.

In 1503, the new bishop Christoph von Utenheim refused to give Basel a new constitution; whereupon, to show its power, the city began to build a new city hall.

In 1529, the city became Protestant under Oecolampadius and the bishop's seat was moved to Porrentruy. The bishop's crook was however retained as the city's coat of arms. For centuries to come, a handful of wealthy families collectively referred to as the "Daig" played a pivotal role in city affairs as they gradually established themselves as a de facto city aristocracy.

The first edition of Christianae religionis institutio (Institutes of the Christian Religion – John Calvin's great exposition of Calvinist doctrine) was published at Basel in March 1536.

In 1544, Johann von Brugge, a rich Dutch Protestant refugee, was given citizenship and lived respectably until his death in 1556, then buried with honors. His body was exhumed and burnt at the stake in 1559 after it was discovered that he was the Anabaptist David Joris.

In 1543, De humani corporis fabrica, the first book on human anatomy, was published and printed in Basel by Andreas Vesalius (1514–1564).

There are indications that Joachim Meyer, author of the influential 16th-century martial arts text Kunst des Fechten ("The Art of Fencing"), came from Basel. In 1661 the Amerbaschsches Kabinett, a vast collection of exotic artifacts, coins, medals and books was purchased by Basel. It was to become to the first public museum of art. Its collection became the core of the later Basel Museum of Art.

The Bernoulli family, which included important 17th- and 18th-century mathematicians such as Jakob Bernoulli, Johann Bernoulli and Daniel Bernoulli, were from Basel. The 18th-century mathematician Leonhard Euler was born in Basel and studied under Johann Bernoulli.

=== Modern history ===
In 1792, the Republic of Rauracia, a revolutionary French client republic, was created. It lasted until 1793. After three years of political agitation and a short civil war in 1833 the disadvantaged countryside seceded from the Canton of Basel, forming the half canton of Basel-Landschaft. Between 1861 and 1878 the city walls were slighted.

On 3 July 1874, Switzerland's first zoo, the Zoo Basel, opened its doors in the south of the city towards Binningen.

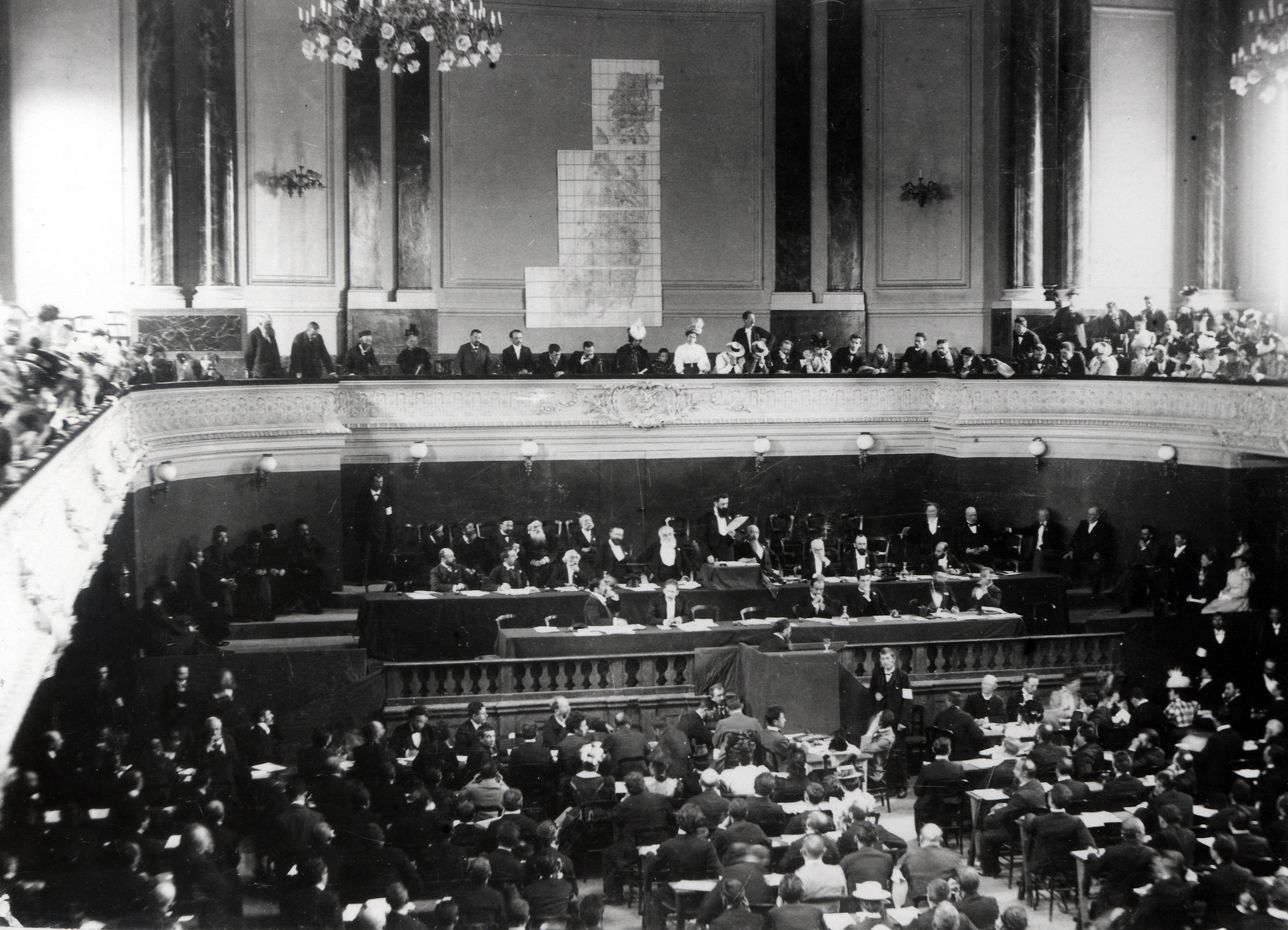
First World Zionist Congress in Basel, 1897 (Stadtcasino)

In 1897 the first World Zionist Congress was held in Basel. Altogether the World Zionist Congress was held in Basel ten times, more than in any other city in the world.

On 16 November 1938, the psychedelic drug LSD was first synthesized by Swiss chemist Albert Hofmann at Sandoz Laboratories in Basel.

In 1967, the population of Basel voted in favor of buying three works of art by painter Pablo Picasso which were at risk of being sold and taken out of the local museum of art, due to a financial crisis on the part of the owner's family. Therefore, Basel became the first city in the world where the population of a political community democratically decided to acquire works of art for a public institution. Pablo Picasso was so moved by the gesture that he subsequently gifted the city with an additional three paintings.

=== Basel as a historical, international meeting place ===
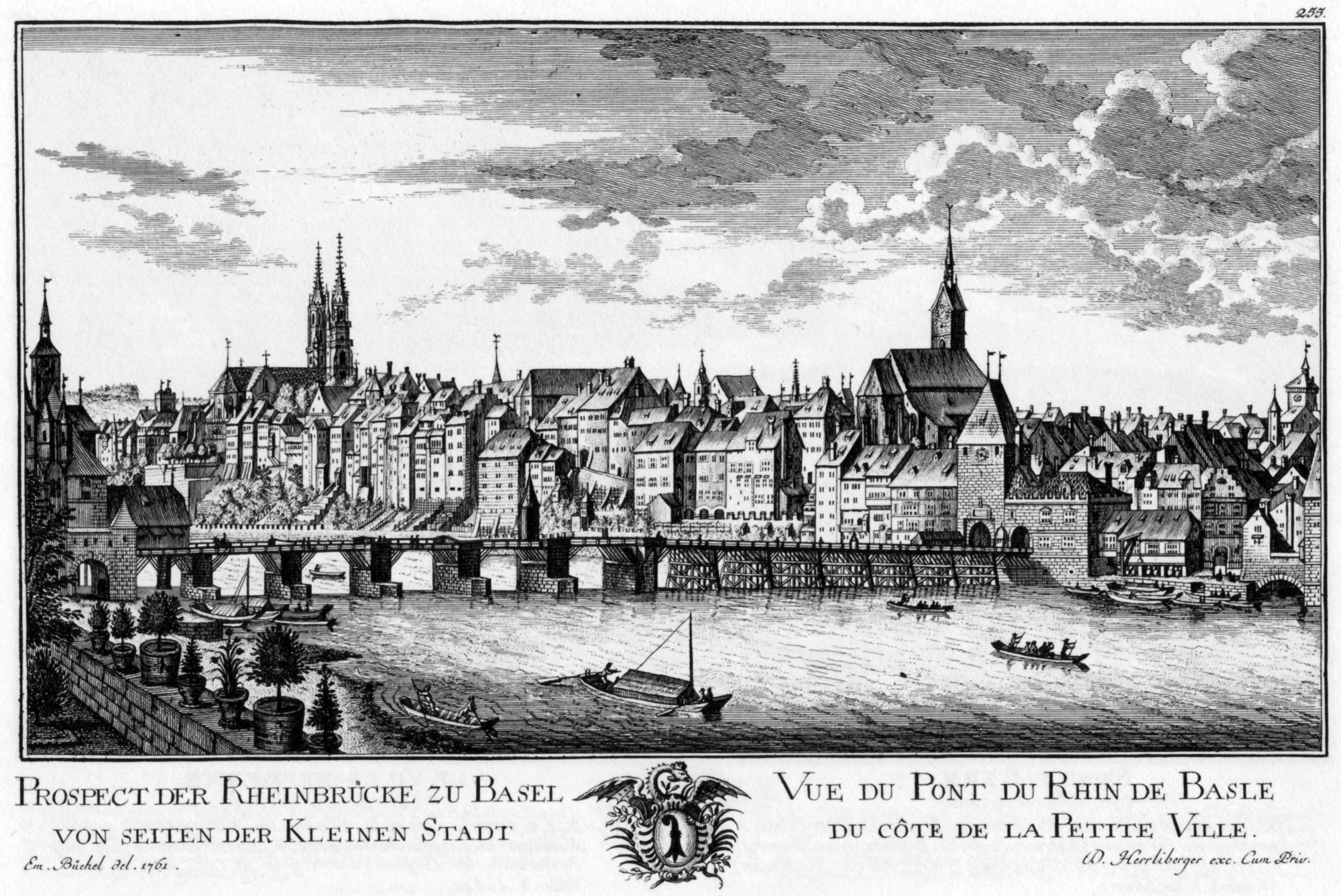
Image of Basel in theTopographie der Eidgenossenschaft (Topography of the [Swiss] Confederation) from 1761

Basel has often been the site of peace negotiations and other international meetings. The Treaty of Basel (1499) ended the Swabian War. Two years later Basel joined the Swiss Confederation. The Peace of Basel in 1795 between the French Republic and Prussia and Spain ended the First Coalition against France during the French Revolutionary Wars. In more recent times, the World Zionist Organization held its first congress in Basel from 29 August through 31 August 1897. Because of the Balkan Wars, the (Socialist) Second International held an extraordinary congress at Basel in 1912. In 1989, the Basel Convention was opened for signature with the aim of preventing the export of hazardous waste from wealthy to developing nations for disposal.

== Geography and climate ==
=== Location ===
Basel is located in Northwestern Switzerland and is commonly considered to be the capital of that region. It is the centre of a trinational metropolitan region spanning Switzerland, France and Germany, with approximately 900,000 inhabitants in its wider urban area. It is close to the point where the Swiss, French and German borders meet, and Basel also has suburbs in France and Germany, with its own monument called the Dreiländereck (Basel). As of 2016, the Swiss Basel agglomeration was the third-largest in Switzerland, with a population of 541,000 in 74 municipalities in Switzerland (municipal count as of 2018). The metropolitan area, called the Trinational Eurodistrict of Basel (TEB), consists of 62 suburban communes including municipalities in neighboring countries, and counted 829,000 inhabitants in 2007.

=== Topography ===
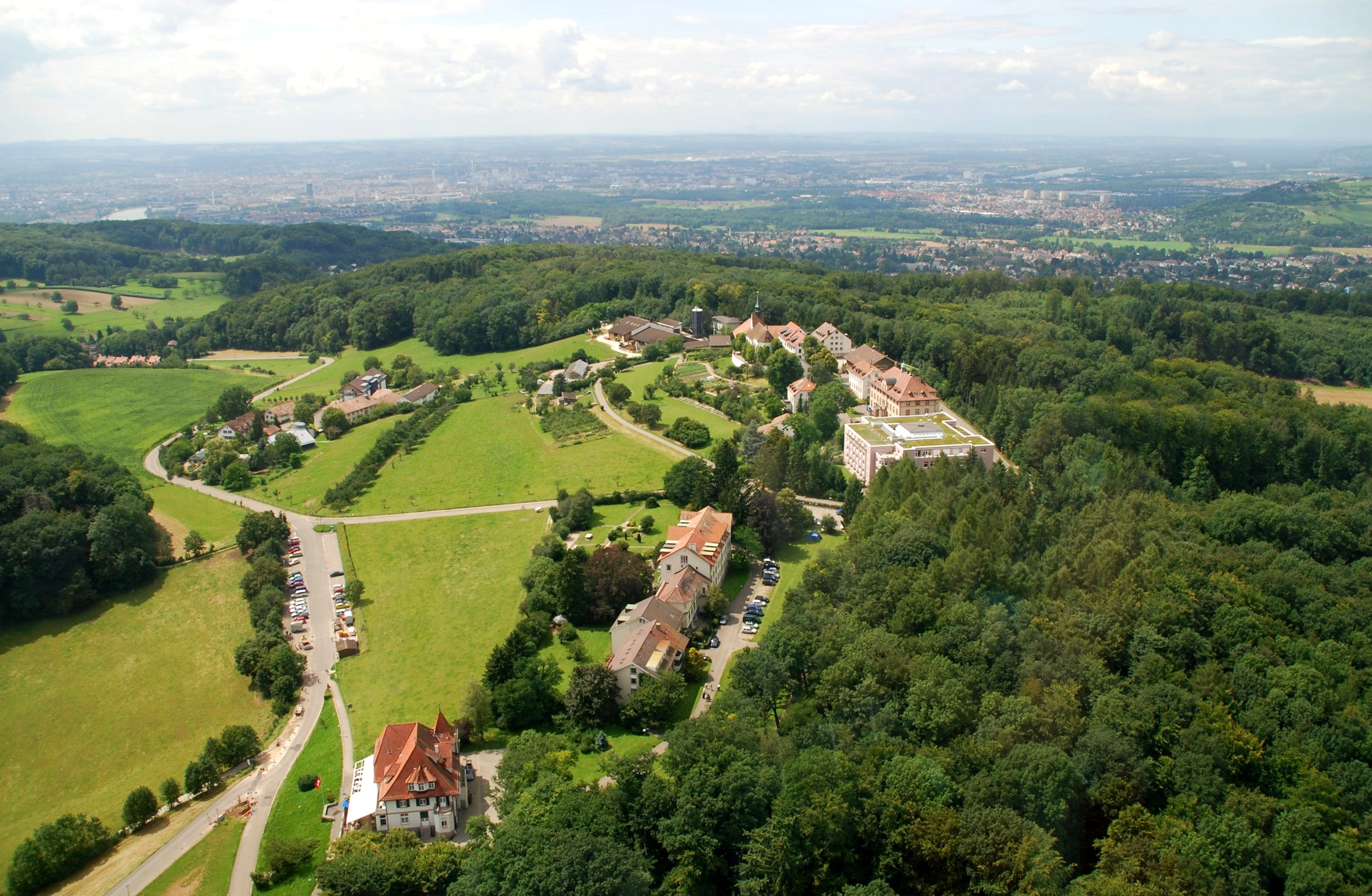
Basel (in the upper left corner) as seen from Bettingen (television tower St. Chrischona) facing France

Basel has an area, as of 2009, of 23.91 square kilometers (9.23 sq mi). Of this area, 0.95 km^{2} (0.37 sq mi) or 4.0% is used for agricultural purposes, while 0.88 km^{2} (0.34 sq mi) or 3.7% is forested. Of the rest of the land, 20.67 km^{2} (7.98 sq mi) or 86.4% is settled (buildings or roads), 1.45 km^{2} (0.56 sq mi) or 6.1% is either rivers or lakes.

Of the built up area, industrial buildings made up 10.2% of the total area while housing and buildings made up 40.7% and transportation infrastructure made up 24.0%. Power and water infrastructure as well as other special developed areas made up 2.7% of the area while parks, green belts and sports fields made up 8.9%. Out of the forested land, all of the forested land area is covered with heavy forests. Of the agricultural land, 2.5% is used for growing crops and 1.3% is pastures. All the water in the municipality is flowing water. The topography of the region is notably flat, as Basel is situated in a valley basin. The Rhine, one of Europe's largest and most significant rivers, flows directly through the heart of the city, dividing it into Grossbasel on the left bank and Kleinbasel on the right.

=== Climate ===
Basel features a temperate oceanic climate (Köppen: Cfb, Trewartha: Dobk), with cool, overcast winters and warm, humid summers.

The city averages 118.2 days of rain or snow annually and on average receives 842 mm (33.1 in) of precipitation. The wettest month is May during which time Basel receives an average of 98 mm (3.9 in) of rain. The month with the most days of precipitation is also May, with an average of 11.7 days. The driest month of the year is February with an average of 45 mm (1.8 in) of precipitation over 8.4 days.

Climate data for Basle (Binningen), elevation: 316 m (1,037 ft), 1991–2020 normals, extremes 1901–present
Month	Jan	Feb	Mar	Apr	May	Jun	Jul	Aug	Sep	Oct	Nov	Dec	Year
Record high °C (°F)	19.0 (66.2)	22.0 (71.6)	25.2 (77.4)	30.5 (86.9)	33.5 (92.3)	38.4 (101.1)	39.0 (102.2)	38.7 (101.7)	35.0 (95.0)	29.6 (85.3)	21.9 (71.4)	20.6 (69.1)	39.0 (102.2)
Mean daily maximum °C (°F)	5.0 (41.0)	8.0 (46.4)	12.0 (53.6)	16.0 (60.8)	20.0 (68.0)	24.0 (75.2)	26.0 (78.8)	25.0 (77.0)	21.0 (69.8)	16.0 (60.8)	9.0 (48.2)	6.0 (42.8)	15.7 (60.3)
Daily mean °C (°F)	3.0 (37.4)	4.5 (40.1)	7.5 (45.5)	11.0 (51.8)	15.0 (59.0)	18.5 (65.3)	20.5 (68.9)	20.0 (68.0)	16.5 (61.7)	12.0 (53.6)	6.0 (42.8)	3.5 (38.3)	12.5 (54.5)
Mean daily minimum °C (°F)	1.0 (33.8)	1.0 (33.8)	3.0 (37.4)	6.0 (42.8)	10.0 (50.0)	13.0 (55.4)	15.0 (59.0)	15.0 (59.0)	12.0 (53.6)	8.0 (46.4)	3.0 (37.4)	1.0 (33.8)	7.5 (45.5)
Record low °C (°F)	−24.2 (−11.6)	−23.8 (−10.8)	−14.8 (5.4)	−6.3 (20.7)	−2.7 (27.1)	1.1 (34.0)	5.1 (41.2)	3.6 (38.5)	−1.3 (29.7)	−5.5 (22.1)	−11.0 (12.2)	−20.9 (−5.6)	−24.2 (−11.6)
Average precipitation mm (inches)	47.8 (1.88)	45.2 (1.78)	49.5 (1.95)	63.5 (2.50)	97.6 (3.84)	86.6 (3.41)	88.9 (3.50)	88.3 (3.48)	70.2 (2.76)	74.4 (2.93)	64.9 (2.56)	65.0 (2.56)	842.0 (33.15)
Average snowfall cm (inches)	7.2 (2.8)	7.2 (2.8)	4.4 (1.7)	0.6 (0.2)	0.0 (0.0)	0.0 (0.0)	0.0 (0.0)	0.0 (0.0)	0.0 (0.0)	0.1 (0.0)	2.0 (0.8)	7.6 (3.0)	29.0 (11.4)
Average precipitation days (≥ 1.0 mm)	9.1	8.4	8.9	9.3	11.7	10.6	10.1	10.2	8.5	10.4	10.0	11.0	118.0
Average snowy days (≥ 1.0 cm)	2.8	2.1	1.1	0.2	0.0	0.0	0.0	0.0	0.0	0.1	0.7	2.3	9.3
Average relative humidity (%)	81	76	69	67	71	70	68	71	77	82	83	82	75
Mean monthly sunshine hours	64.5	85.2	134.6	167.4	185.6	211.9	234.9	216.5	160.1	107.0	65.4	54.2	1,687
Percentage possible sunshine	28	34	40	45	44	48	54	55	48	36	28	27	41
Source 1: NOAA
Source 2: MeteoSwissKNMI

== Politics ==
The city of Basel functions as the capital of the Swiss cantonhistorically called as half-canton or nowadays as "cantons with half of a cantonal vote"-of Basel-Stadt.

=== Canton ===
The canton Basel-Stadt consists of three municipalities: Riehen, Bettingen, and the city Basel itself. The political structure and agencies of the city and the canton are identical.

The official language of Basel is German, (Note: The official language in all municipalities in German-speaking Switzerland is German, where 'German' is used as an umbrella term for all varieties of German. By law, one may communicate with the authorities using any variant of German, in written or oral form. However, the authorities will always use Swiss Standard German (the Swiss variety of Standard German) in documents and writing. Orally, they would use either Hochdeutsch (i.e., Swiss Standard German or what the particular speaker considers High German), or a dialectal variant depending on the speaker's origin.) but the main spoken language is Basel German, the local variant of the Alemannic Swiss German dialect.

=== City ===
==== Quarters ====
The city itself has 19 quarters:

- Grossbasel (Greater Basel):

1 Altstadt Grossbasel
2 Vorstädte
3 Am Ring
4 Breite
5 St. Alban
6 Gundeldingen
7 Bruderholz
8 Bachletten
9 Gotthelf
10 Iselin
11 St. Johann

- Kleinbasel (Lesser Basel):

12 Altstadt Kleinbasel
13 Clara
14 Wettstein
15 Hirzbrunnen
16 Rosental
17 Matthäus
18 Klybeck
19 Kleinhüningen

=== Government ===
The city's and canton's executive, the Executive Council (Regierungsrat), consists of seven members for a mandate period of 4 years. They are elected by any inhabitant valid to vote on the same day as the parliament, but by means of a system of Majorz, and operates as a collegiate authority. The president (German: Regierungspräsident(in)) is elected as such by a public election, while the heads of the other departments are appointed by the collegiate. The current president is Beat Jans. The executive body holds its meetings in the red Town Hall (German: Rathaus) on the central Marktplatz. The building was built in 1504–14.

As of 2024, Basel's Executive Council is made up of three representatives of the SP (Social Democratic Party), two LDP (Liberal-Demokratische Partei of Basel) including the president, and one member each of Green Liberals (glp), and CVP (Christian Democratic Party). The last election was held on 20 October and 24 November 2024 and one new member has been elected.

The Regierungsrat of Basel for the mandate period 2025–28
Councillor (Regierungsrat/ -rätin)	Party	Head of Office (Departement, since) of	elected since
Cramer Conradin (Note: President (Regierungspräsident))	LDP	President's Office (Präsidialdepartement (PD), 2025)	2016
Tanja Soland	SP	Finance (Finanzdepartement (FD))	2019
Stephanie Eymann	LDP	Justice and Security (Justiz- und Sicherheitsdepartement (JSD), 2021)	2020
Kaspar Sutter	SP	Economics, Social Services, and Environment (Departement für Wirtschaft, Soziales und Umwelt (WSU), 2021)	2020
Esther Keller	glp	Construction and Transportation (Bau- und Verkehrsdepartement (BVD), 2021)	2020
Lukas Engelberger ä (Note: Vice President (Regierungsvicepräsident))	CVP	Health (Gesundheitsdepartement (GD), June 2014)	June 2014
Mustafa Atici	SP	Education (Erziehungsdepartement (ED), 2025)	2024

Barbara Schüpbach-Guggenbühlis is State Chronicler (Staatsschreiberin) since 2009, and Marco Greiner is Head of Communication (Regierungssprecher) and Vice State Chronicler (Vizestaatsschreiber) since 2007 for the Executive Council.

=== Parliament ===
Grosser Rat of Basel for the mandate period of 2025–2028
1. BastA! (6.00%)
2. SP (31.0%)
3. Greens (12.0%)
4. glp (7.00%)
5. Centre (7.00%)
6. EVP (4.00%)
7. LDP (12.0%)
8. FDP (7.00%)
9. SVP (12.0%)
10. AB (1.00%)
11. VA (1.00%)

The city's and canton's parliament, the Grand Council of Basel-Stadt (Grosser Rat), consists of 100 seats, with members (called in German: Grossrat/Grossrätin) elected every 4 years. The sessions of the Grand Council are public. Unlike the members of the Executive Council, the members of the Grand Council are not politicians by profession, but they are paid a fee based on their attendance. Any resident of Basel allowed to vote can be elected as a member of the parliament. The delegates are elected by means of a system of Proporz. The legislative body holds its meetings in the red Town Hall (Rathaus).

The last election was held on 20 October 2024 for the mandate period (Legislatur) of 2025–2028. As of 1 February 2021, the Grand Council consist of 31 (+1) members of the Social Democratic Party (SP), 12 Grüne Basel-Stadt and its junior party, 6 Basels starke Alternative (BastA!)), 12 (-2) Liberal-Demokratische Partei (LDP), 12 (+1) Swiss People's Party (SVP), 7 (-1) Green Liberal Party (glp), 7 (-) The Liberals (FDP), 7 (-) The Centre (former CVP), 4 (+1) Evangelical People's Party (EVP), and one each representative of the Aktive Bettingen (AB) and Volks-Aktion gegen zuviele Ausländer und Asylanten in unserer Heimat (VA).

The left parties missed an absolute majority by two seats.

=== Federal elections ===
==== National Council ====
In the 2023 federal election the most popular party was the Social Democratic Party (SP) which received 30.0% (-3.9) of the votes. The next five most popular parties were the LPS (9.8%, -4.7) and the FDP (6.0, +0.2), which are chained together at 15.8% (-4.5), the Green Party (GPS) (13.9%, -5.5), the SVP (12.4%, +1.1), and the Green Liberal Party (GLP) (6.4%, +1.4), CVP (4.8%, +0.7). In the federal election, a total of 56’705 votes were cast, and the voter turnout was 49.73%.

In the 2019 federal election the most popular party was the Social Democratic Party (SP) which received two seats with 34% (−1) of the votes. The next five most popular parties were the Green Party (GPS) (19.4%, +7.3), the LPS (14.5%, +3.6) and the FDP (5.8, −3.5), which are chained together at 20.3%, (+0.1), the SVP (11.3%, -5.5), and the Green Liberal Party (GLP) (5%, +0.6), CVP (4.1%, -1.9). In the federal election, a total of 54,628 votes were cast, and the voter turnout was 49.4%.

On 18 October 2015, in the federal election the most popular party was the Social Democratic Party (SP) which received two seats with 35% of the votes. The next three most popular parties were the FDP (20.2%), the SVP (16.8%), and the Green Party (GPS) (12.2%), each with one seat. In the federal election, a total of 57,304 votes were cast, and the voter turnout was 50.4%.

National Councillors (Nationalrat/ -rätin) of Basel-Town 2019–2023
Councillor	Party	part of the National Council since	no. of votes
Sarah Wyss	SP	2023	22,032
Sibel Arslan	GPS	2015	14,239
Patricia Falkenstein	LDP	2023	9,792
Katja Christ	GLP	2019	6,655

Beat Jans ( SP) has been elected as Federal Councillor in 2023 and presides since 1 January 2024 the Federal Department of Justice and Police.

==== Council of States ====
On 22 October 2023, in the federal election Eva Herzog, member of the Social Democratic Party (SP), was re-elected as a State Councillor (Ständerätin) in the first round as single representative of the canton of Basel-Town national Council of States (Ständerat) with an absolute majority of 42'677 votes.

On 20 October 2019, in the federal election Eva Herzog, member of the Social Democratic Party (SP), was elected for the first time as a State Councillor (Ständerätin) in the first round as single representative of the canton of Basel-Town and successor of Anita Fetz in the national Council of States (Ständerat) with an absolute majority of 37'210 votes.

On 18 October 2015, in the federal election State Councillor (German: Ständerätin) Anita Fetz, member of the Social Democratic Party (SP), was re-elected in the first round as single representative of the canton of Basel-Town in the national Council of States (Ständerat) with an absolute majority of 35'842 votes. She has been a member of it since 2003.

=== International relations ===
==== Twin towns, sister cities and partner regions ====
Basel currently has five partnerships:

- (United States) US state of Massachusetts, since 2002
- Shanghai, China, since 2007
- Toyama Prefecture, Japan, since 2009
- (United States) Miami Beach, US, since 2011
- Seoul, South Korea, since 2022

== Demographics ==
Largest groups of foreign residents 2021
Nationality	Number	% total (foreigners)
Germany	16,562	8.2 (22.3)
Italy	8,671	4.3 (11.7)
Turkey	5,741	2.8 (7.7)
Spain	4,176	2.0 (5.6)
Portugal	3,390	1.7 (4.6)
France	2,393	1.2 (3.2)
Kosovo	2,186	1.1 (2.9)
United Kingdom	2,132	1.1 (2.7)
North Macedonia	2,095	1.0 (2.8)
Serbia	1,797	0.9 (2.4)
India	1,661	0.8 (2.2)
USA	1,629	0.8 (2.2)
Austria	1,273	0.6 (1.7)

Historical population
Year	Pop.	±%
1850	27,844	—
1860	38,692	+39.0%
1870	44,868	+16.0%
1880	61,737	+37.6%
1888	71,131	+15.2%
1900	109,161	+53.5%
1910	132,276	+21.2%
1920	135,976	+2.8%
1930	148,063	+8.9%
1941	162,105	+9.5%
1950	183,543	+13.2%
1960	206,746	+12.6%
1970	212,857	+3.0%
1980	182,143	−14.4%
1990	178,428	−2.0%
2000	166,558	−6.7%
2010	163,216	−2.0%
2020	173,863	+6.5%

The canton of Basel (slightly more than the city itself) has a population (As of 2021) of 201,971, of whom 36.9% are resident foreign nationals.

Over the 10 years of 1999–2009 the population has changed at a rate of −0.3%. It has changed at a rate of 3.2% due to migration and at a rate of −3% due to births and deaths.

Of the population in the municipality 58,560 or about 35.2% were born in Basel and lived there in 2000. There were 1,396 or 0.8% who were born in the same canton, while 44,874 or 26.9% were born somewhere else in Switzerland, and 53,774 or 32.3% were born outside of Switzerland.

In 2008 there were 898 live births to Swiss citizens and 621 births to non-Swiss citizens, and in same time span there were 1,732 deaths of Swiss citizens and 175 non-Swiss citizen deaths. Ignoring immigration and emigration, the population of Swiss citizens decreased by 834 while the foreign population increased by 446. There were 207 Swiss men and 271 Swiss women who emigrated from Switzerland. At the same time, there were 1756 non-Swiss men and 1655 non-Swiss women who immigrated from another country to Switzerland. The total Swiss population change in 2008 (from all sources, including moves across municipal borders) was an increase of 278 and the non-Swiss population increased by 1138 people. This represents a population growth rate of 0.9%.

As of 2000, there were 70,502 people who were single and never married in the municipality. There were 70,517 married individuals, 12,435 widows or widowers, and 13,104 individuals who are divorced.

As of 2000 the average number of residents per living room was 0.59 which is about equal to the cantonal average of 0.58 per room. In this case, a room is defined as space of a housing unit of at least 4 m^{2} (43 sq ft) as normal bedrooms, dining rooms, living rooms, kitchens and habitable cellars and attics. About 10.5% of the total households were owner occupied, or in other words did not pay rent (though they may have a mortgage or a rent-to-own agreement). As of 2000, there were 86,371 private households in the municipality, and an average of 1.8 persons per household. There were 44,469 households that consist of only one person and 2,842 households with five or more people. Out of a total of 88,646 households that answered this question, 50.2% were households made up of just one person and there were 451 adults who lived with their parents. Of the rest of the households, there are 20,472 married couples without children, 14,554 married couples with children There were 4,318 single parents with a child or children. There were 2,107 households that were made up of unrelated people and 2,275 households that were made up of some sort of institution or another collective housing.

In 2000 there were 5,747 single family homes (or 30.8% of the total) out of a total of 18,631 inhabited buildings. There were 7,642 multi-family buildings (41.0%), along with 4,093 multi-purpose buildings that were mostly used for housing (22.0%) and 1,149 other use buildings (commercial or industrial) that also had some housing (6.2%). Of the single family homes 1090 were built before 1919, while 65 were built between 1990 and 2000. The greatest number of single family homes (3,474) were built between 1919 and 1945.

In 2000 there were 96,640 apartments in the municipality. The most common apartment size was 3 rooms of which there were 35,958. There were 11,957 single room apartments and 9,702 apartments with five or more rooms. Of these apartments, a total of 84,675 apartments (87.6% of the total) were permanently occupied, while 7,916 apartments (8.2%) were seasonally occupied and 4,049 apartments (4.2%) were empty. As of 2009, the construction rate of new housing units was 2.6 new units per 1000 residents.

As of 2003 the average price to rent an average apartment in Basel was 1118.60 Swiss francs (CHF) per month (US$890, £500, €720 approx. exchange rate from 2003). The average rate for a one-room apartment was 602.27 CHF (US$480, £270, €390), a two-room apartment was about 846.52 CHF (US$680, £380, €540), a three-room apartment was about 1054.14 CHF (US$840, £470, €670) and a six or more room apartment cost an average of 2185.24 CHF (US$1750, £980, €1400). The average apartment price in Basel was 100.2% of the national average of 1116 CHF. The vacancy rate for the municipality, in 2010, was 0.74%.

=== Language ===
In 2000, most of the population spoke German (129,592 or 77.8%), with Italian being second most common (9,049 or 5.4%) and French being third (4,280 or 2.6%). There were 202 people who spoke Romansh.

=== Religion ===
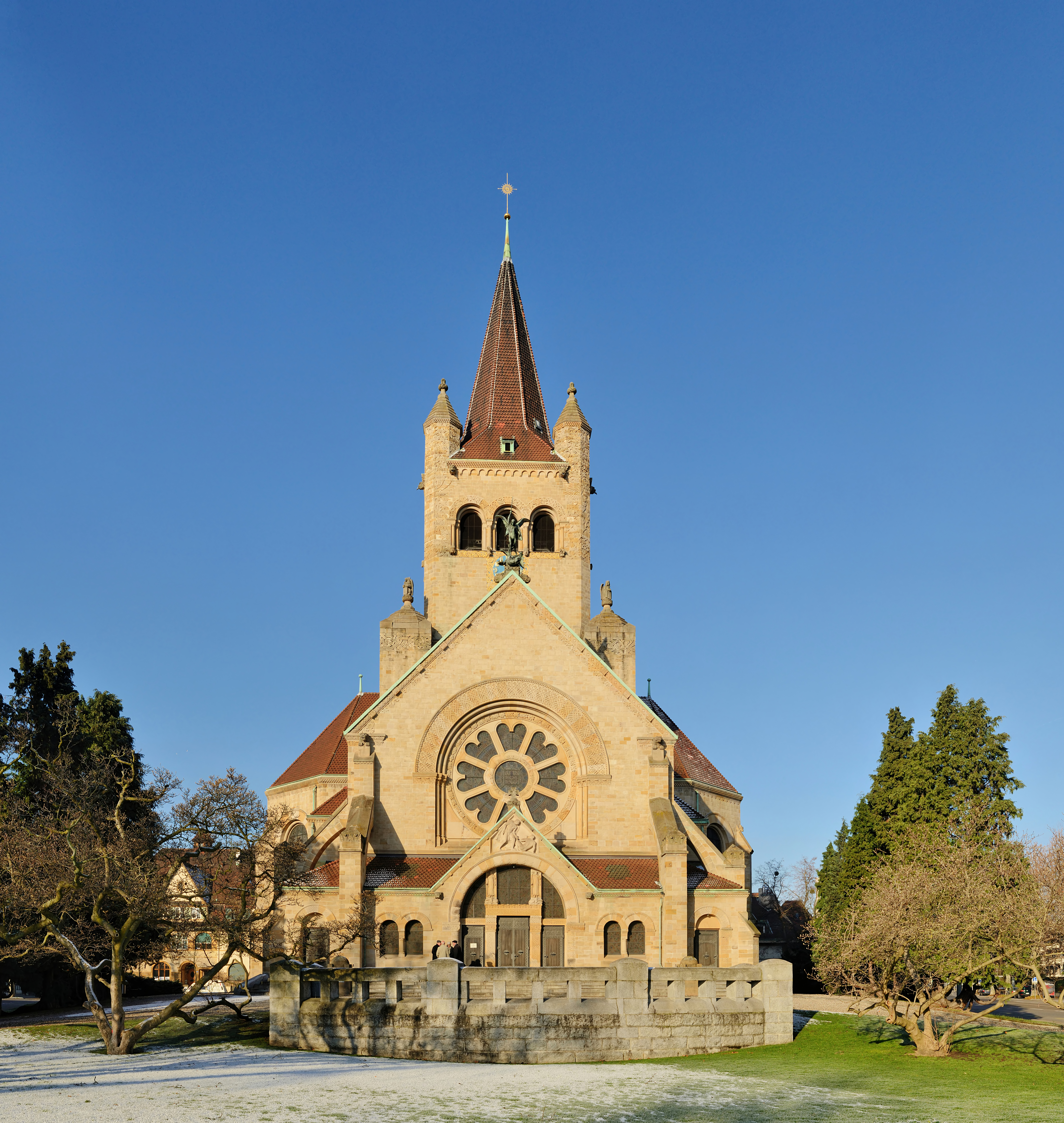
St. Paul's Church, a Reformed Church in Basel

From the 2000 census, 41,916 or 25.2% were Roman Catholic, while 39,180 or 23.5% belonged to the Swiss Reformed Church. Of the rest of the population, there were 4,567 members of an Orthodox church (or about 2.74% of the population), 459 individuals (or about 0.28% of the population) who belonged to the Christian Catholic Church and 3,464 individuals (or about 2.08% of the population) who belonged to another Christian church. There were 12,368 individuals (or about 7.43% of the population) who were Muslim, 1,325 individuals (or about 0.80% of the population) who were Jewish, however only members of religious institutions are counted as such by the municipality, which makes the actual number of people of Jewish descent living in Basel considerably higher. There were 746 individuals who were Buddhist, 947 individuals who were Hindu and 485 individuals who belonged to another church. 52,321 (or about 31.41% of the population) belonged to no church, are agnostic or atheist, and 8,780 individuals (or about 5.27% of the population) did not answer the question.

== Infrastructure ==
=== Quarters ===
Basel is subdivided into 19 quarters (Quartiere). The municipalities of Riehen and Bettingen, outside the city limits of Basel, are included in the canton of Basel-Stadt as rural quarters (Landquartiere).

Quartier	Area	Population (March 2012)	Population density (people/km2)
Altstadt Grossbasel (historic city)	37.63	2,044	5,431.8
Vorstädte (historical suburbs)	89.66	4,638	5,172.9
Am Ring	90.98	10,512	11,554.2
Breite	68.39	8,655	12,655.4
St. Alban	294.46	10,681	3,633
Gundeldingen	123.19	18,621	15,140
Bruderholz	259.61	9,006	3,477
Bachletten	151.39	13,330	8,830
Gotthelf	46.62	6,784	14,551.7
Iselin	109.82	16,181	14,840
St. Johann	223.90	18,560	8,323
Altstadt Kleinbasel (historic city)	24.21	2,276	9,401
Clara	23.66	4,043	17,088
Wettstein	75.44	5,386	7,139.4
Hirzbrunnen	305.32	8,676	2,845
Rosental	64.33	5,180	8,052
Mattäus	59.14	16,056	27,149.1
Klybeck	91.19	7,234	7,932.9
Kleinhüningen	136.11	2,772	2,038
City of Basel	2275.05	178,120	7,847
Bettingen	222.69	1,248	567
Riehen	1086.10	21,788	2,017
Canton of Basel-Stadt	3583.84	201,156	5,619

=== Transport ===
==== Port ====
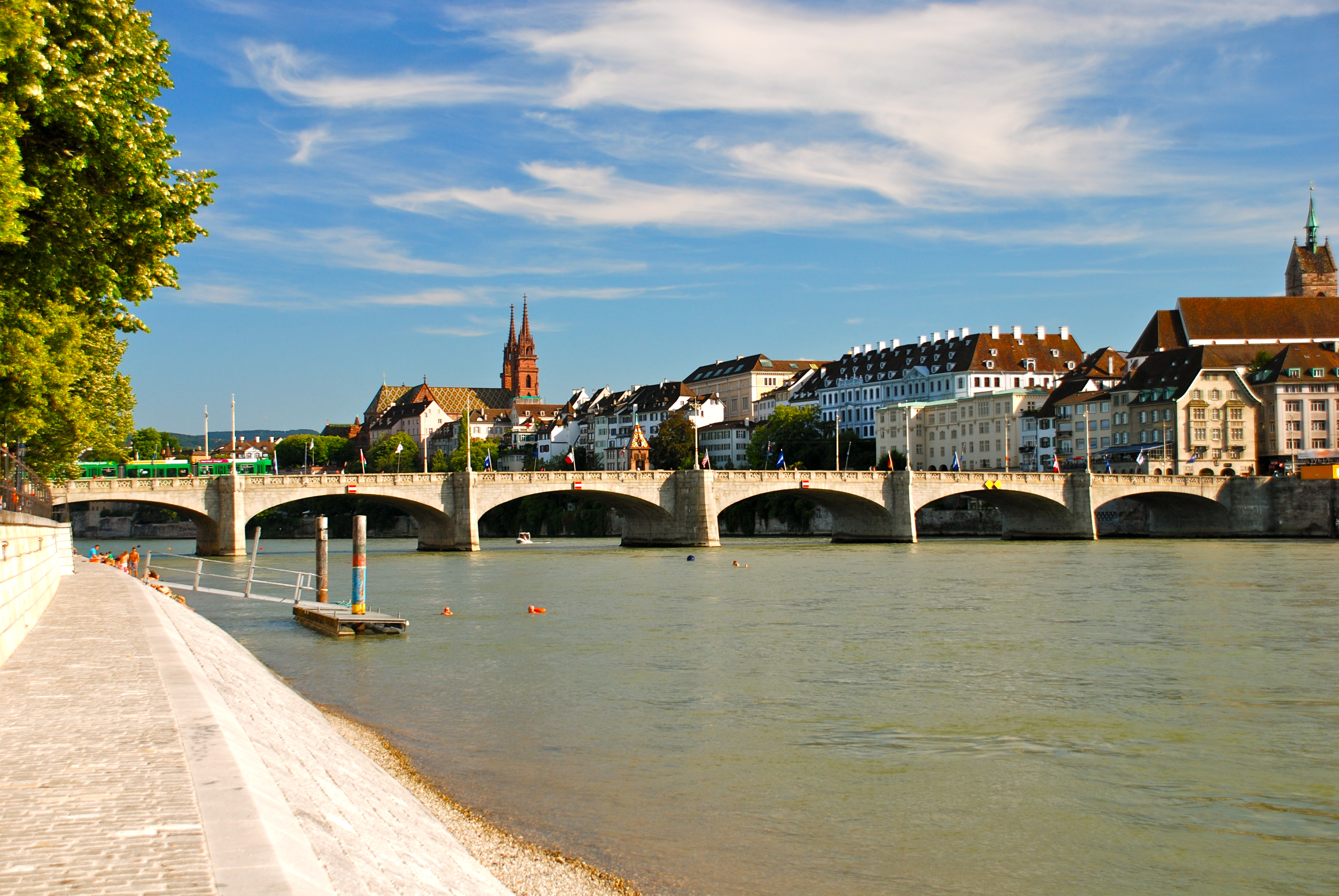
The Rhine in Basel as Switzerland's gateway to the sea

Basel has Switzerland's only cargo port, through which goods pass along the navigable stretches of the Rhine and connect to ocean-going ships at the port of Rotterdam.

==== Air transport ====
EuroAirport Basel Mulhouse Freiburg is operated jointly by two countries, France and Switzerland, although the airport is located completely on French soil. The airport itself is split into two architecturally independent sectors, one half serving the French side and the other half serving the Swiss side; prior to Schengen there was an immigration inspection point at the middle of the airport so that people could "emigrate" to the other side of the airport.

==== Railways ====
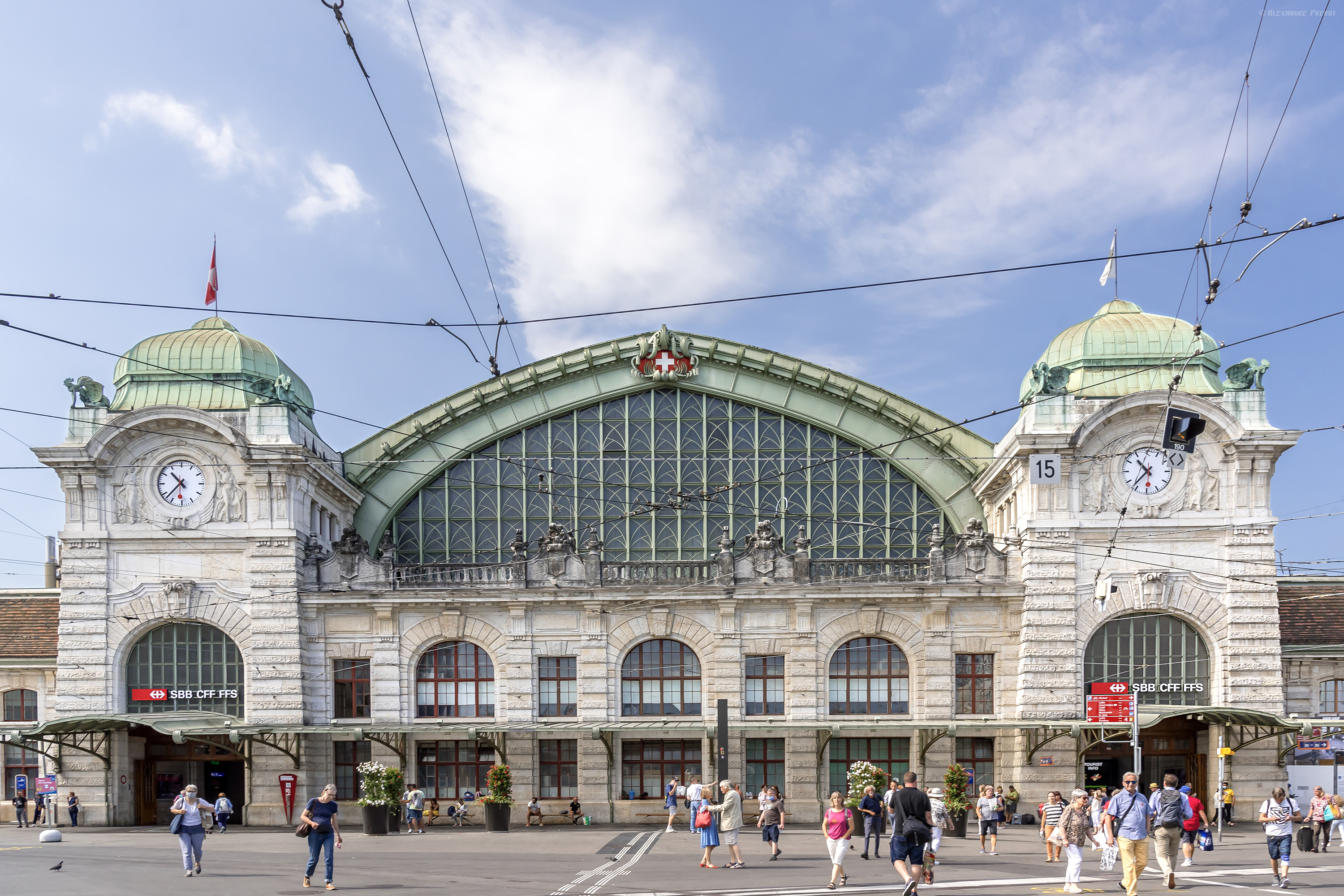
Basel SBB station, built in 1907

Basel was the first Swiss city with a railway station and it has long held an important place as a rail hub. Three main railway stations—those of the Swiss, French and German networks—lie within the city, although the Swiss (Basel SBB) and French (Bâle SNCF) stations are actually in the same complex, separated by customs and immigration facilities. The German Basel Badischer Bahnhof (abbreviated to Basel Bad Bf) is on the northern side of the city. Two other, smaller stations within the city limits are Basel Dreispitz and Basel St. Johann. All stations are connected to the local tram and bus network (BVB). Basel's regional rail services are supplied by the Basel S-Bahn, which links the city with destinations in Switzerland, France and Germany.

Most long-distance trains call at Basel SBB station, such as EC, TGV, ICE, IC and IR services. The ICE also calls at Basel Bad Bf. The new high-speed ICE railway line from Karlsruhe to Basel was completed in 2008 while phase I of the TGV Rhine-Rhône line, opened in December 2011, has reduced travel time from Basel to Paris to about 3 hours.

The largest goods railway complex of the country is located just outside the city, spanning the municipalities of Muttenz and Pratteln.

==== Roads ====
Basel is located on the A3 motorway.

Within the city limits, five bridges connect Greater and Lesser Basel (downstream):

- Schwarzwaldbrücke (built 1972)
- Wettsteinbrücke (current structure built 1998, original bridge built 1879)
- Mittlere Rheinbrücke (lit. 'Middle Rhine bridge', current structure built 1905, original bridge built 1225 as the first bridge to cross the Rhine)
- Johanniterbrücke (built 1967)
- Dreirosenbrücke (built 2004, original bridge built 1935)

==== Ferries ====
A somewhat anachronistic yet still widely used system of reaction ferry boats links the two shores. There are four ferries, each situated approximately midway between two bridges. Each is attached by a cable to a block that rides along another cable spanning the river at a height of 20 to 30 metres (66 to 98 feet). To cross the river, the ferryman orients the boat around 45° from the current so that the current pushes the boat across the river. This form of transportation is therefore completely hydraulically driven, requiring no outside energy source. Home/Aktuell – Fähri Verein Basel

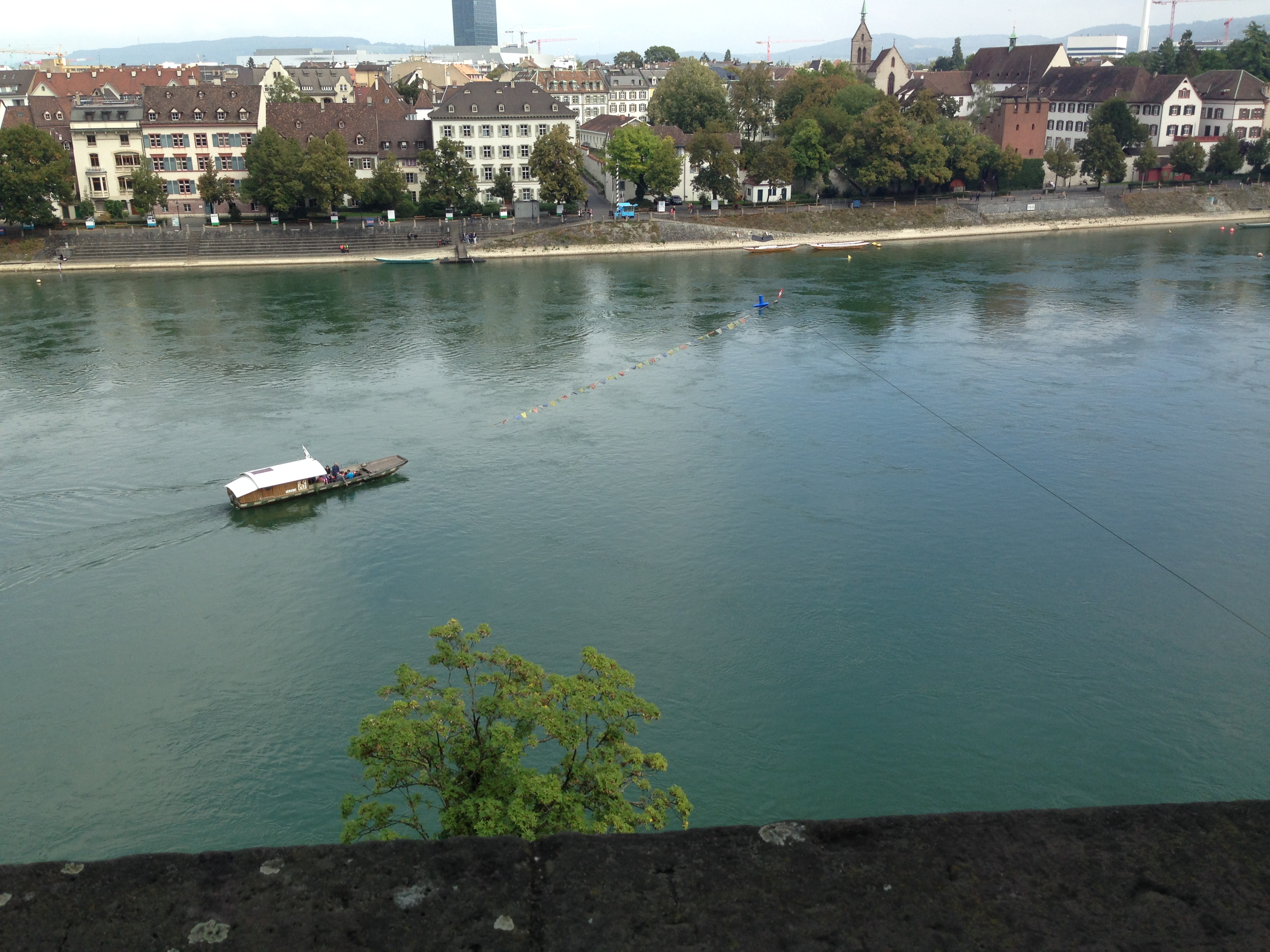
Cable ferry across the Rhine in Basel

==== Public transport ====
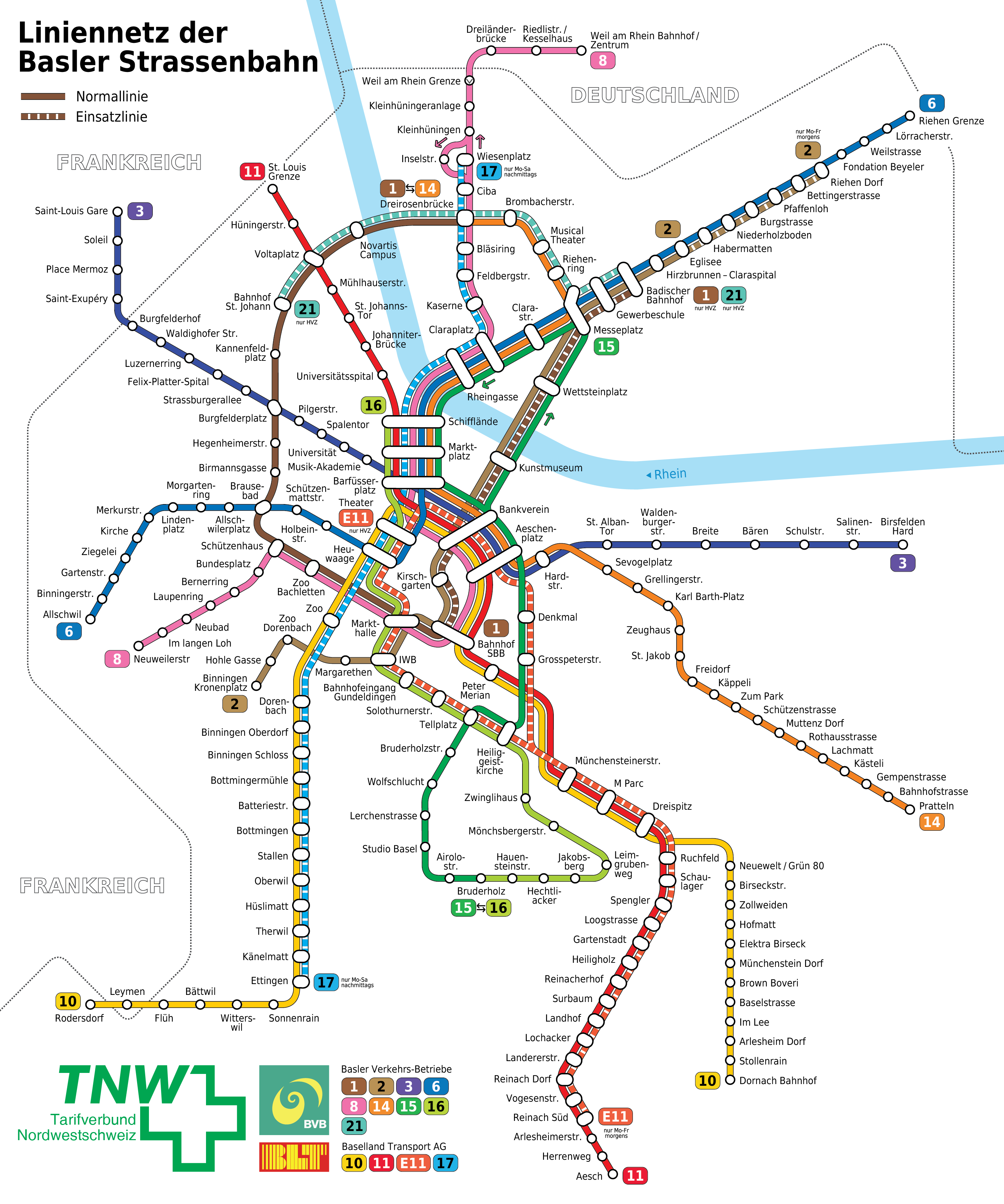
Basel tram network

Basel has an extensive public transportation network serving the city and connecting to surrounding suburbs, including a large tram network. Today, Basel has the largest tramway in terms of kilometers of rail tracks in Switzerland. Historically, only Geneva had a larger one at some point.

The green-colored local trams and buses are operated by the Basler Verkehrs-Betriebe (BVB). The yellow-colored buses and trams are operated by the Baselland Transport (BLT), and connect areas in the nearby half-canton of Baselland to central Basel. The BVB also shares commuter bus lines in cooperation with transit authorities in the neighboring Alsace region in France and Baden region in Germany. The Basel Regional S-Bahn, the commuter rail network connecting to suburbs surrounding the city, is jointly operated by SBB, SNCF and DB.

==== Border crossings ====
Basel is located at the meeting point of France, Germany, and Switzerland; because it sits on the Swiss national border and is beyond the Jura Mountains, many within the Swiss military reportedly believe that the city is indefensible during wartime. It has numerous road and rail crossings between Switzerland and the other two countries. With Switzerland joining the Schengen Area on 12 December 2008, immigration checks were no longer carried out at the crossings. However, Switzerland did not join the European Union Customs Union (though it did join the EU Single Market) and customs checks are still conducted at or near the crossings.

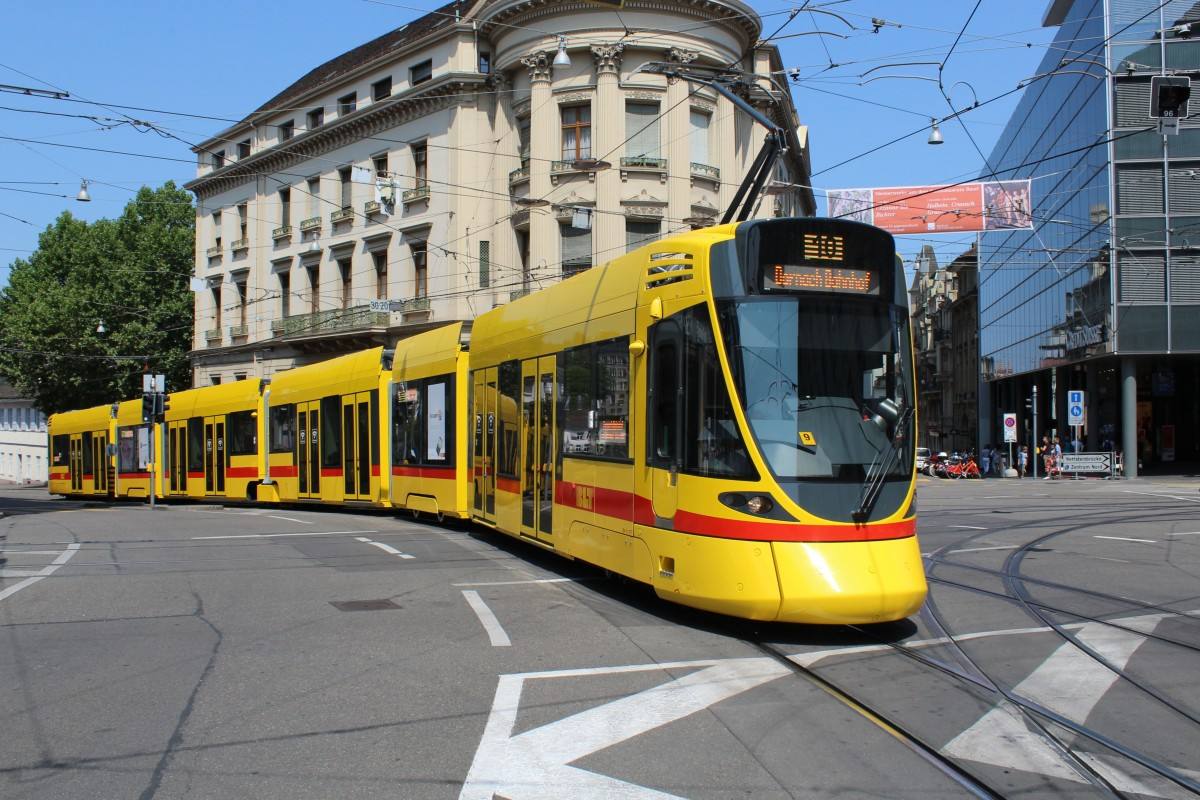
Tram in the city centre (Bankverein)

France-Switzerland (from east to west)

- Road crossings (with French road name continuation)
  - Kohlenstrasse (Avenue de Bâle, Huningue). This crossing replaces the former crossing Hüningerstrasse further east.
  - Elsässerstrasse (Avenue de Bâle, Saint-Louis)
  - Autobahn A3 (A35 autoroute, Saint-Louis), crossing Mulhouse, Colmar and Strasbourg.
  - EuroAirport Basel-Mulhouse-Freiburg – pedestrian walkway between the French and Swiss sections on Level 3 (departures) of airport.
  - Burgfelderstrasse (Rue du 1er Mars, Saint Louis)
- Railway crossing
  - Basel SBB railway station

Germany-Switzerland (clockwise, from north to south)

- Road crossings (with German road name continuation)
  - Hiltalingerstrasse (Zollstraße, Weil am Rhein). Tram 8 goes along this road to Weil am Rhein. The extension opened in 2014; it used to end before the border.
  - Autobahn A2 (Autobahn A5, Weil am Rhein)
  - Freiburgerstrasse (Baslerstraße, Weil am Rhein)
  - Weilstrasse, Riehen (Haupstraße, Weil am Rhein)
  - Lörracherstrasse, Riehen (Baslerstraße, Stetten, Lörrach)
  - Inzlingerstrasse, Riehen (Riehenstraße, Inzlingen)
  - Grenzacherstrasse (Hörnle, Grenzach-Wyhlen)
- Railway crossing
  - Between Basel SBB and Basel Badischer Bahnhof – Basel Badischer Bahnhof, and all other railway property and stations on the right bank of the Rhine belong to DB and are classed as German customs territory. Immigration and customs checks are conducted at the platform exit tunnel for passengers leaving trains here.

Additionally there are many footpaths and cycle tracks crossing the border between Basel and Germany.

=== Health ===
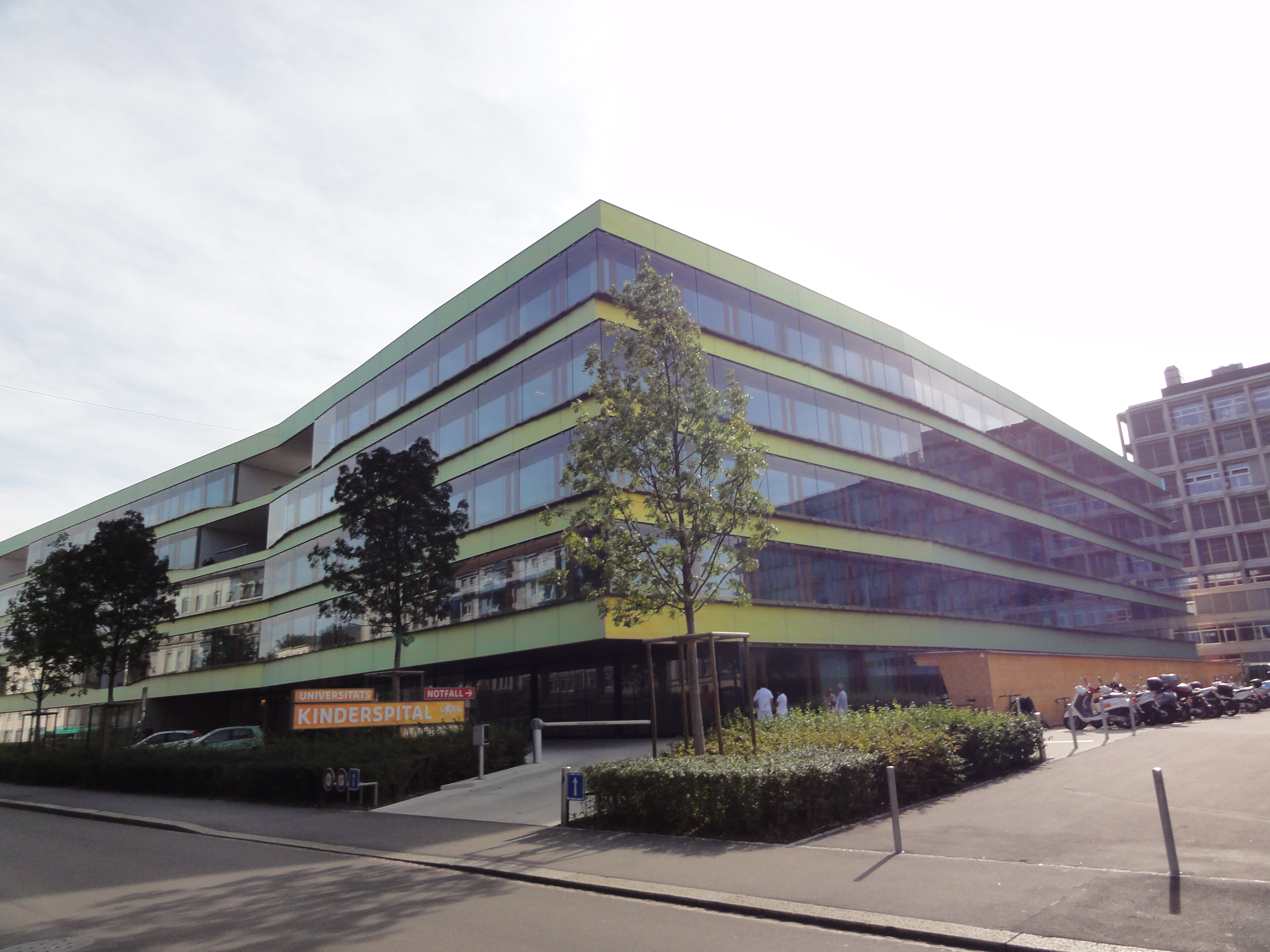
University Children's Hospital Basel

As the biggest town in the Northwest of Switzerland numerous public and private health centres are located in Basel. Among others the Universitätsspital Basel and the Universitätskinderspital Basel. Private health centres include the Bethesda Spital and the Merian Iselin Klinik. Additionally the Swiss Tropical and Public Health Institute is located in Basel too.

=== Energy ===
Basel is at the forefront of a national vision to more than halve energy use in Switzerland by 2050. To research, develop and commercialise the technologies and techniques required for the country to become a 2000 Watt society, a number of projects have been set up since 2001 in the Basel metropolitan area. These include demonstration buildings constructed to Minergie or Passivhaus standards, electricity generation from renewable energy sources, and vehicles using natural gas, hydrogen and biogas. A building construction law was passed in 2002 also which stated that all new flat roofs must be greened leading to Basel becoming the world's leading green roof city. This was driven by an energy saving programme.

A hot dry rock geothermal energy project was cancelled in 2009 since it caused induced seismicity in Basel.

== Economy ==
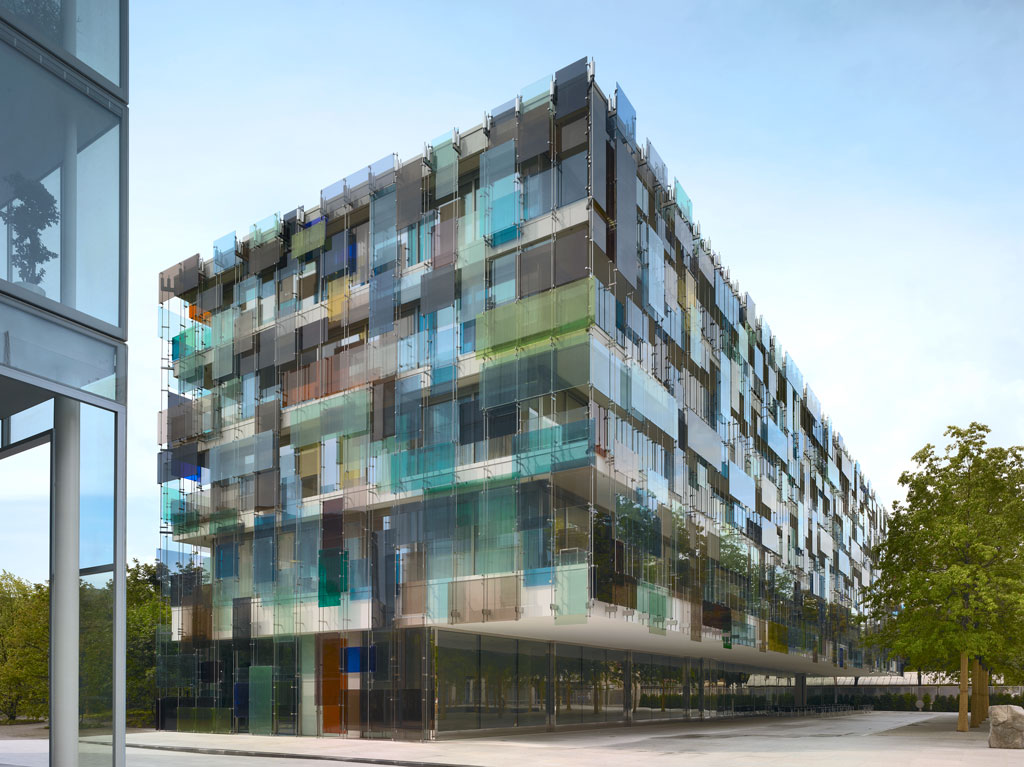
Novartis Campus Basel

The city of Basel, located in the north west of Switzerland, is one of the most dynamic economic regions of Switzerland.

As of 2016, Basel had an unemployment rate of 3.7%. As of 2018, 19.3% of the working population was employed in the secondary sector and 80.6% was employed in the tertiary sector. There were 82,449 residents of the municipality who were employed in some capacity, of which women made up 46.2% of the workforce.

In 2008 the total number of full-time equivalent jobs was 130,988. The number of jobs in the primary sector was 13, of which 10 were in agriculture and 4 were in forestry or lumber production. The number of jobs in the secondary sector was 33,171 of which 24,848 or (74.9%) were in manufacturing, 10 were in mining and 7,313 (22.0%) were in construction. The number of jobs in the tertiary sector was 97,804. In the tertiary sector; 12,880 or 13.2% were in wholesale or retail sales or the repair of motor vehicles, 11,959 or 12.2% were in the movement and storage of goods, 6,120 or 6.3% were in a hotel or restaurant, 4,186 or 4.3% were in the information industry, 10,752 or 11.0% were the insurance or financial industry, 13,695 or 14.0% were technical professionals or scientists, 6,983 or 7.1% were in education and 16,060 or 16.4% were in health care.

In 2000, there were 121,842 workers who commuted into the municipality and 19,263 workers who commuted away. The municipality is a net importer of workers, with about 6.3 workers entering the municipality for every one leaving. About 23.9% of the workforce coming into Basel are coming from outside Switzerland, while 1.0% of the locals commute out of Switzerland for work. Of the working population, 49.2% used public transportation to get to work, and 18.7% used a private car.

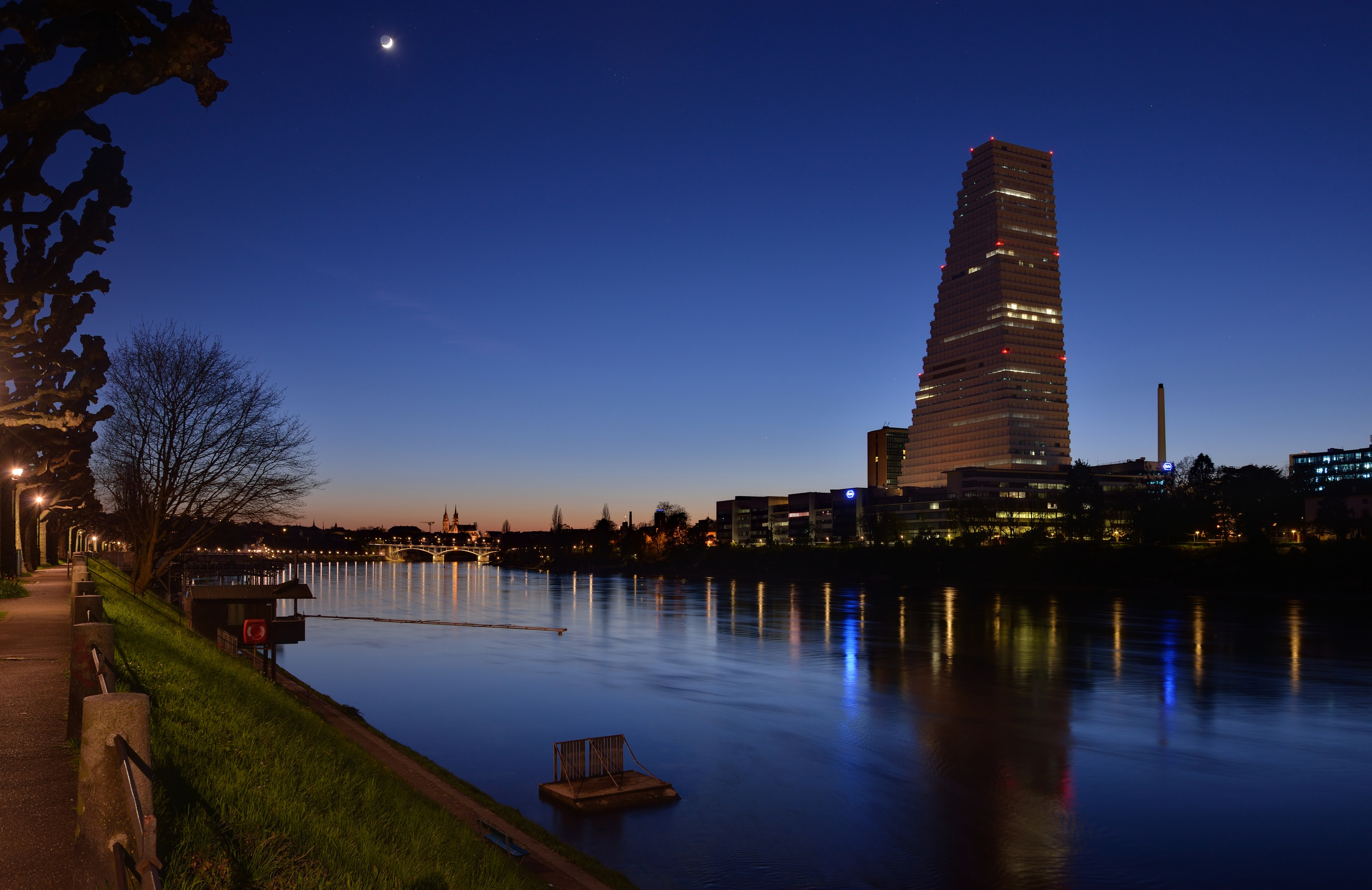
Roche Tower, the tallest building in Switzerland

The first Roche Tower, designed by Herzog & de Meuron, is 41 floors and 178 metres (584 ft) high, upon its opening in 2015 it has become the tallest building in Switzerland. Roche Tower-2 was opened in 2022, has 50 floors and is Switzerland's tallest building. Basel has also Switzerland's third tallest building (Basler Messeturm, 105 m (344 ft)) and Switzerland's tallest tower (St. Chrischona TV tower, 250 m (820 ft)).

=== Chemical industry ===
The Swiss chemical industry operates largely from Basel, and Basel also has a large pharmaceutical industry. Novartis, Syngenta, Ciba Specialty Chemicals, Clariant, Hoffmann-La Roche, Basilea Pharmaceutica, and Actelion are headquartered there. Pharmaceuticals and specialty chemicals have become the modern focus of the city's industrial production.

Basel is a biotech and biopharmaceutical hub in Europe, with many startups being financed via venture capital investment locally.

=== Banking ===
Banking is important to Basel:

- UBS maintains central offices in Basel.
- The Bank for International Settlements (BIS) is located within the city and is the central banker's bank.

According to the BIS, "The choice of Switzerland for the seat of the BIS was a compromise by those countries that established the BIS: Belgium, France, Germany, Italy, Japan, the United Kingdom and the United States. When consensus could not be reached on locating the Bank in London, Brussels or Amsterdam, the choice fell on Switzerland. An independent, neutral country, Switzerland offered the BIS less exposure to undue influence from any of the major powers. Within Switzerland, Basel was chosen largely because of its location, with excellent railway connections in all directions, especially important at a time when most international travel was by train."
Created in May 1930, the BIS is owned by its member central banks. No agent of the Swiss public authorities may enter the premises without the express consent of the bank. The bank exercises supervision and police power over its premises. The BIS enjoys immunity from criminal and administrative jurisdiction.
The Basel Committee on Banking Supervision usually meets at the BIS premises in Basel. It has produced recommendations such as Basel I, Basel II and Basel III, based on consensus among its members which are central banks and banking supervisors.

- Basel also hosts the headquarters of the Global Infrastructure Basel Foundation, which is active in the field of sustainable infrastructure (financing).

=== Air ===
Swiss International Air Lines, the national airline of Switzerland, is headquartered on the grounds of EuroAirport Basel-Mulhouse-Freiburg in Saint-Louis, Haut-Rhin, France, near Basel. Prior to the formation of Swiss International Air Lines, the regional airline Crossair was headquartered near Basel.

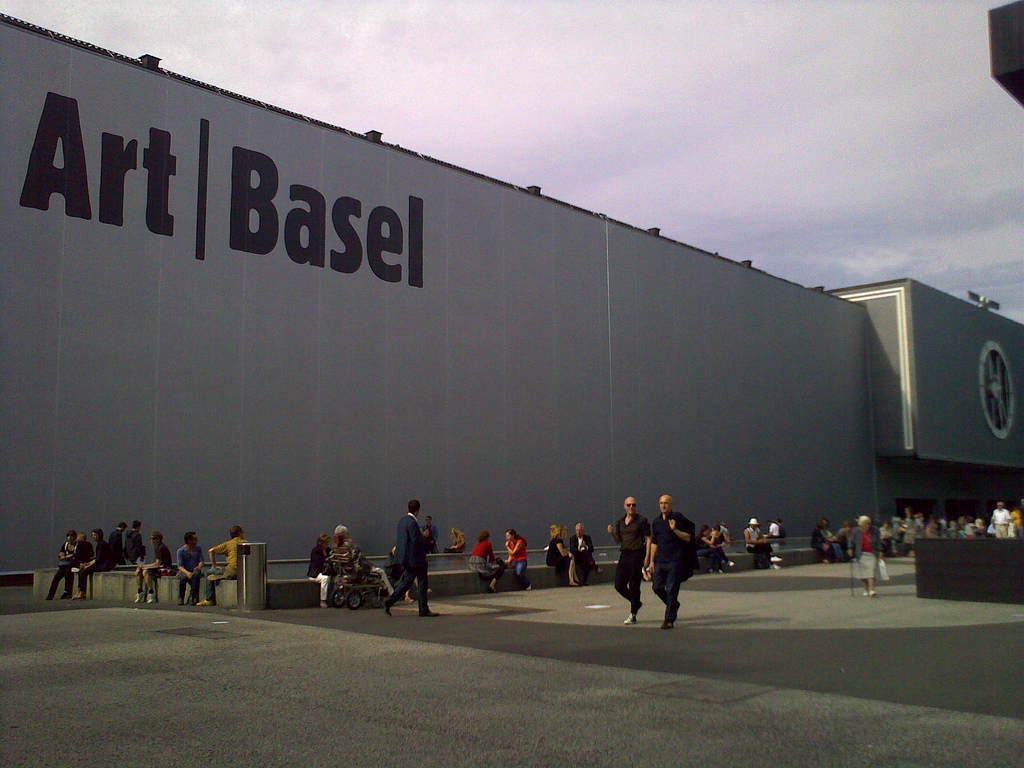
Art Basel (2009)

=== Media ===
Basler Zeitung ("BaZ") and bz Basel are the local newspapers. The local TV station is called Telebasel. The German-speaking Swiss Radio and Television SRF company, part of the Swiss Broadcasting Corporation SRG SSR, holds offices in Basel as well. The academic publishers Birkhäuser, Karger and MDPI are based in Basel.

=== Trade fairs ===
Important trade shows include Art Basel, the world's most important fair for modern and contemporary art, Baselworld (watches and jewelry, now discontinued), Swissbau (construction and real estate) and Igeho (hotels, catering, take-away, care). The Swiss Sample Fair ("Schweizer Mustermesse") was the largest and oldest consumer fair in Switzerland. It was held from 2007 to 2019 and took place in Kleinbasel on the right bank of the Rhine.

== Education ==
Besides Humanism, the city of Basel has also been well known for its achievements in the field of mathematics. Among others, the mathematician Leonhard Euler and the Bernoulli family have done research and been teaching at the local institutions for centuries. In 1910 the Swiss Mathematical Society was founded in the city and in the mid-twentieth century the Russian mathematician Alexander Ostrowski taught at the local university. In 2000 about 57,864 or (34.7%) of the population have completed non-mandatory upper secondary education, and 27,603 or (16.6%) have completed additional higher education (either university or a Fachhochschule). Of the 27,603 who completed tertiary schooling, 44.4% were Swiss men, 31.1% were Swiss women, 13.9% were non-Swiss men and 10.6% were non-Swiss women.

In 2010 11,912 students attended the University of Basel (55% female). 25% were foreign nationals, 16% were from canton of Basel-Stadt. In 2006, 6162 students studied at one of the nine academies of the FHNW (51% female).

As of 2000, there were 5,820 students in Basel who came from another municipality, while 1,116 residents attended schools outside the municipality.

=== Universities ===
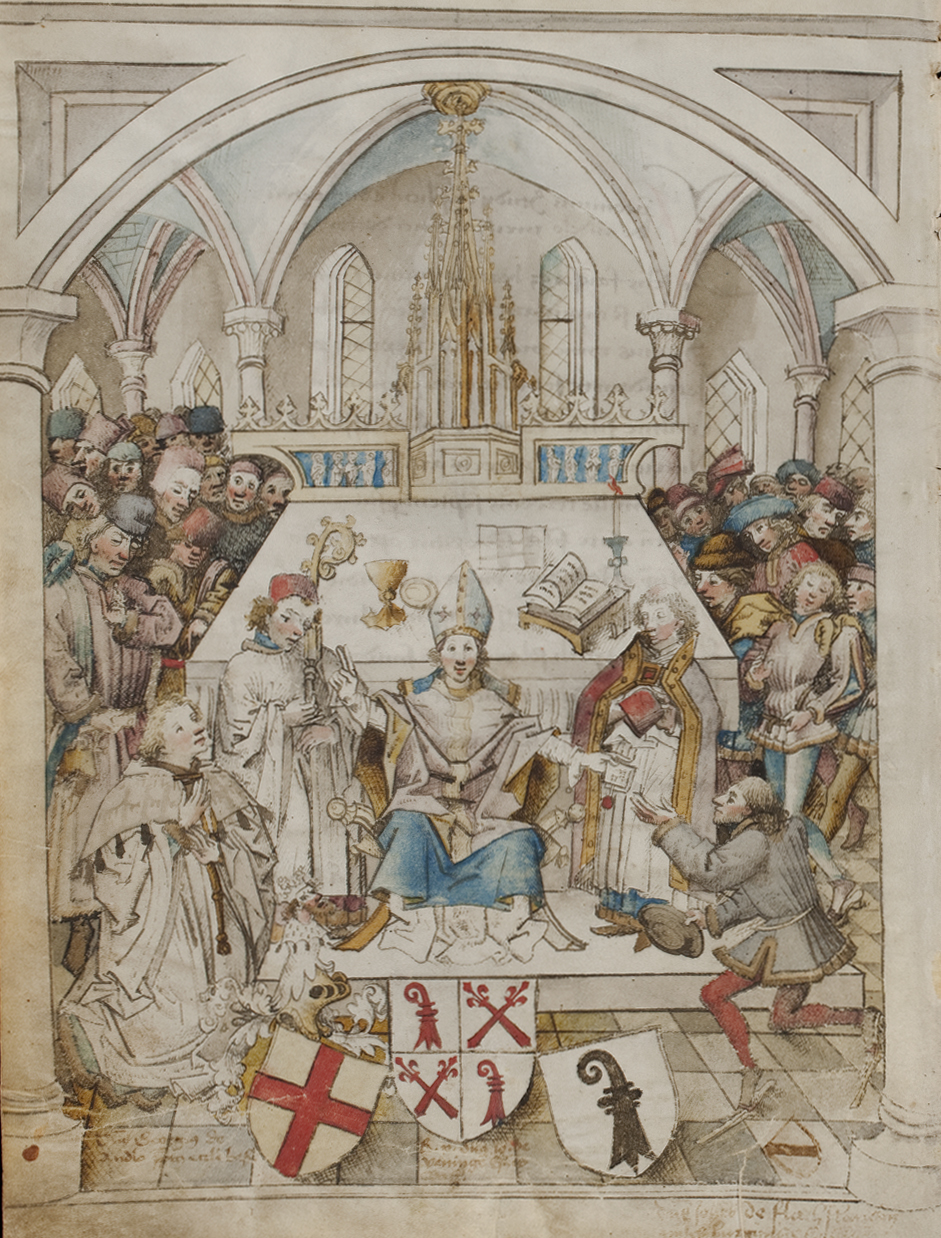
Inauguration ceremony of the University of Basel, 1460

Basel hosts Switzerland's oldest university, the University of Basel, dating from 1460. Erasmus, Paracelsus, Daniel Bernoulli, Leonhard Euler, Jacob Burckhardt, Friedrich Nietzsche, Tadeusz Reichstein, Karl Jaspers, Carl Gustav Jung, and Karl Barth worked there. The University of Basel is currently counted among the 90 best educational institutions worldwide.

In 2007, the ETH Zurich (Swiss Federal Institute of Technology Zürich) established the Department of Biosystems Science and Engineering (D-BSSE) in Basel. The creation of the D-BSSE was driven by a Swiss-wide research initiative SystemsX, and was jointly supported by funding from the ETH Zürich, the Swiss Government, the Swiss University Conference (SUC) and private industry.

Basel also hosts several academies of the Fachhochschule Nordwestschweiz (FHNW): the FHNW Academy of Art and Design, FHNW Academy of Music, and the FHNW School of Business.

Basel is renowned for various scientific societies, such as the Entomological Society of Basel (Entomologische Gesellschaft Basel, EGB), which celebrated its 100th anniversary in 2005.

=== Volksschule ===
In 2005 16,939 pupils and students attended the Volksschule (the obligatory school time, including Kindergarten (127), primary schools (Primarschule, 25), and lower secondary schools (Sekundarschule, 10)), of which 94% visited public schools and 39.5% were foreign nationals. In 2010 already 51.1% of all pupils spoke another language than German as their first language. In 2009 3.1% of the pupils visited special classes for pupils with particular needs. The average amount of study in primary school in Basel is 816 teaching hours per year.

=== Upper secondary school ===
In 2010 65% of the youth finished their upper secondary education with a vocational training and education, 18% finished their upper secondary education with a Federal Matura at one of the five gymnasiums, 5% completed a Fachmaturität at the FMS, 5% completed a Berufsmaturität synchronously to their vocational training, and 7% other kind of upper secondary maturity. 14.1% of all students at public gymnasiums were foreign nationals. The Maturity quota in 2010 was on a record high at 28.8% (32.8 female, 24.9% male).

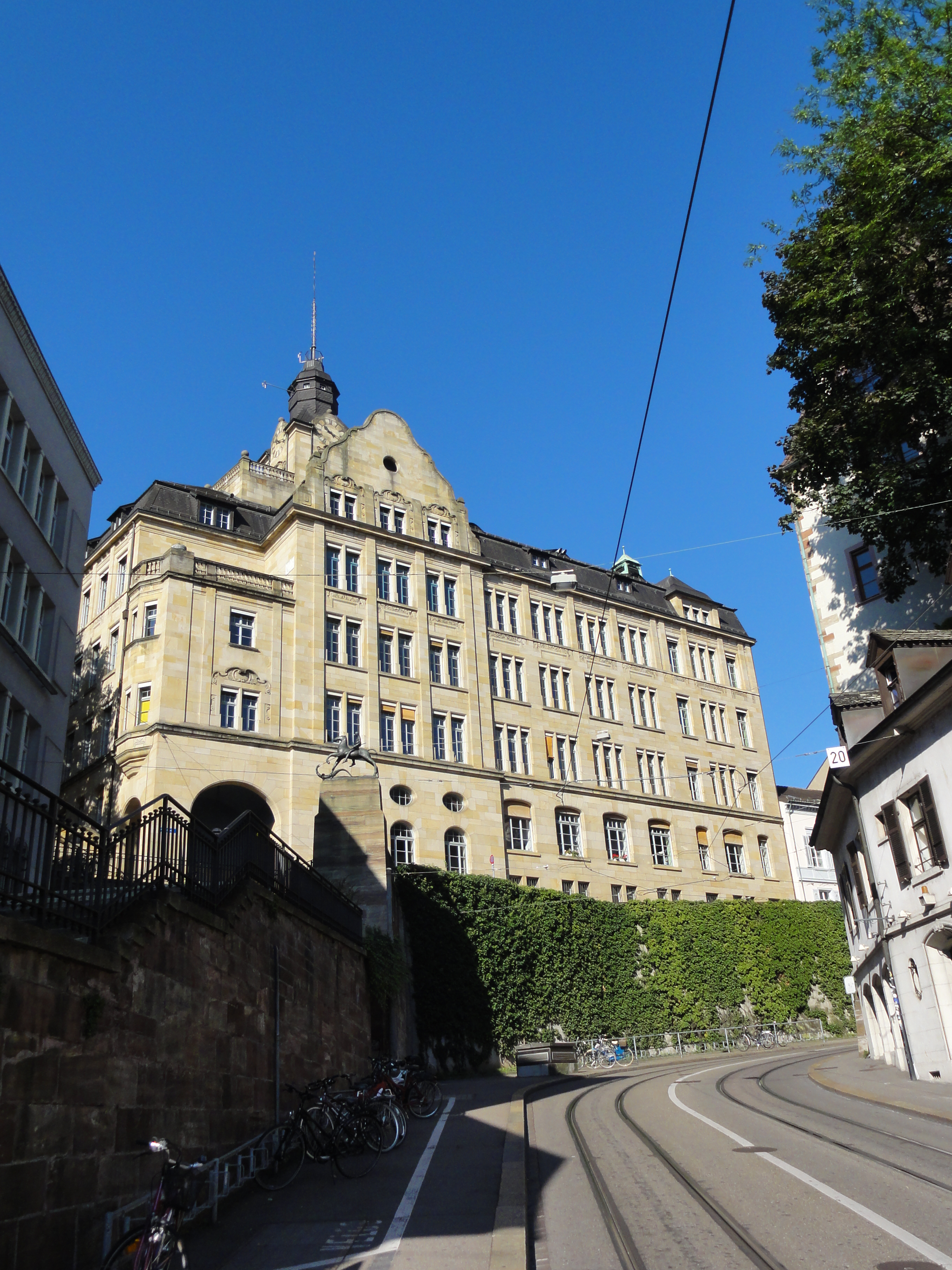
The Gymnasium Leonhard

Basel has five public gymnasiums (Gymnasium Bäumlihof, Gymnasium Kirschgarten, Gymnasium am Münsterplatz, Gymnasium Leonhard, Wirtschaftsgymnasium und Wirtschaftsmittelschule Basel), each with its own profiles (different focus on major subjects, such as visual design, biology and chemistry, Italian, Spanish, or Latin languages, music, physics and applied mathematics, philosophy/education/psychology, and economics and law) that entitles students with a successful Matura graduation to attend universities. And one Fachmaturitätsschule, the FMS, with six different major subjects (health/natural sciences, education, social work, design/art, music/theatre/dance, and communication/media) that entitles students with a successful Fachmatura graduation to attend Fachhochschulen. Four different höhere Fachschulen (higher vocational schools such as Bildungszentrum Gesundheit Basel-Stadt (health), Allgemeine Gewerbeschule Basel (trade), Berufsfachschule Basel, Schule für Gestaltung Basel (design)) allows vocational students to improve their knowledge and know-how.

=== International schools ===
As a city with a percentage of foreigners of more than thirty-five per cent and as one of the most important centres in the chemical and pharmaceutical field in the world, Basel counts several international schools including: Academia International School, École Française de Bâle, Freies Gymnasium Basel (private), Gymnasium am Münsterplatz (public), Schweizerisch-italienische Primarschule Sandro Pertini, International School Basel, BLIS Baselland International School, and SIS Swiss International School.

=== Libraries ===
Basel is home to at least 65 libraries. Some of the largest include; the Universitätsbibliothek Basel (main university library), the special libraries of the University of Basel, the Allgemein Bibliotheken der Gesellschaft für Gutes und Gemeinnütziges (GGG) Basel, the Library of the Pädagogische Hochschule, the Library of the Hochschule für Soziale Arbeit and the Library of the Hochschule für Wirtschaft. There was a combined total (as of 2008) of 8,443,643 books or other media in the libraries, and in the same year a total of 1,722,802 items were loaned out.

== Culture ==
=== Main sights ===
The red sandstone Münster, one of the foremost late-Romanesque/early Gothic buildings in the Upper Rhine, was badly damaged in the great earthquake of 1356, rebuilt in the 14th and 15th century, extensively reconstructed in the mid-19th century and further restored in the late 20th century. A memorial to Erasmus lies inside the Münster. The City Hall from the 16th century is located on the Market Square and is decorated with fine murals on the outer walls and on the walls of the inner court.

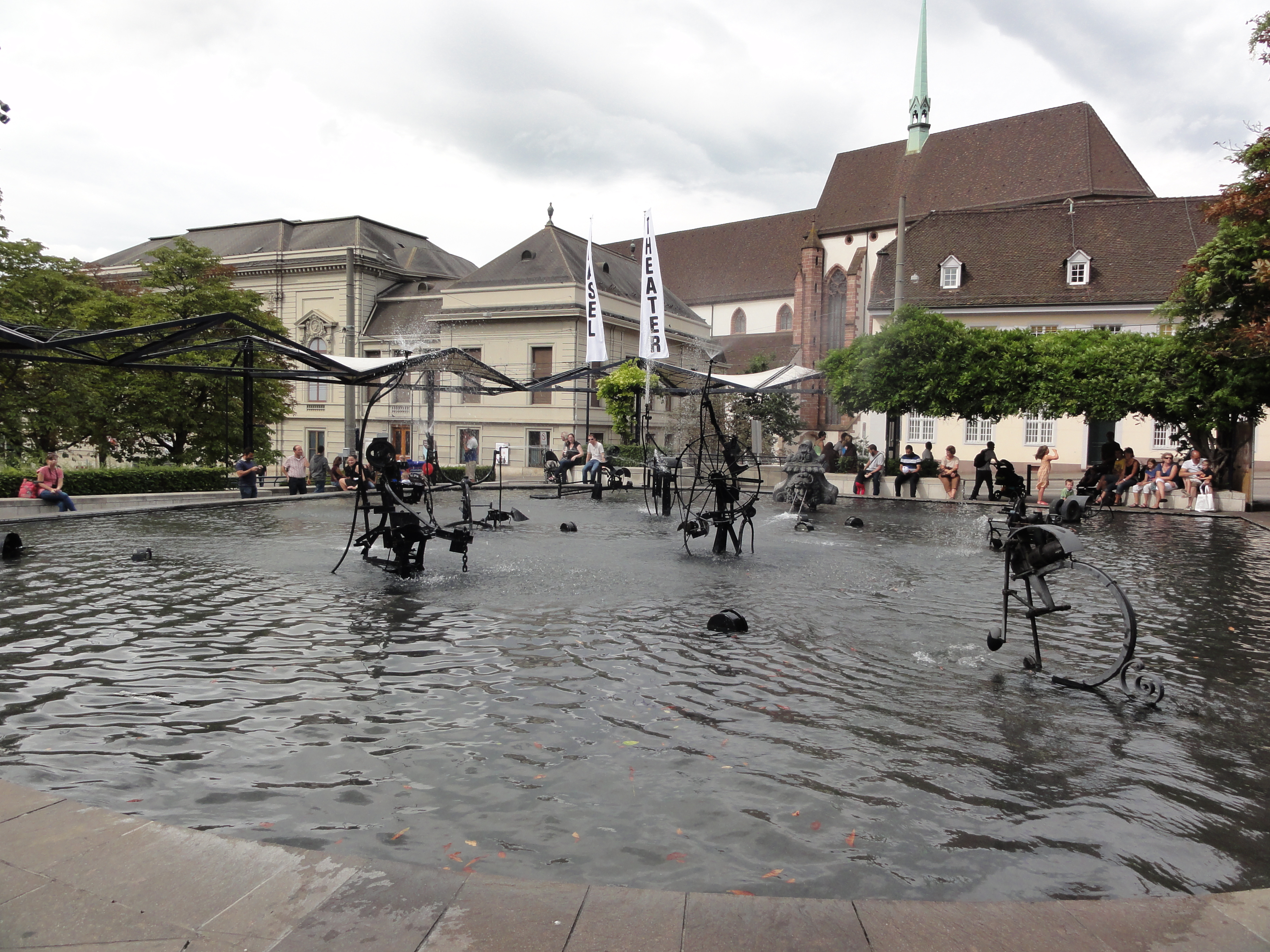
Tinguely's Carnival Fountain (Fasnachtsbrunnen)

Basel is also host to an array of buildings by internationally renowned architects. These include the Beyeler Foundation by Renzo Piano, or the Vitra complex in nearby Weil am Rhein, composed of buildings by architects such as Zaha Hadid (fire station), Frank Gehry (Design Museum), Álvaro Siza Vieira (factory building), and Tadao Ando (conference centre). Basel also features buildings by Mario Botta (Jean Tinguely Museum and Bank of International settlements) and Herzog & de Meuron (whose architectural practice is in Basel, and who are best known as the architects of Tate Modern in London and the Bird's Nest in Beijing, the Olympia stadium, which was designed for use throughout the 2008 Summer Olympics and Paralympics). The city received the Wakker Prize in 1996.

==== Heritage sites ====
Basel features a great number of heritage sites of national significance.

These include the entire Old Town of Basel as well as the following buildings and collections:

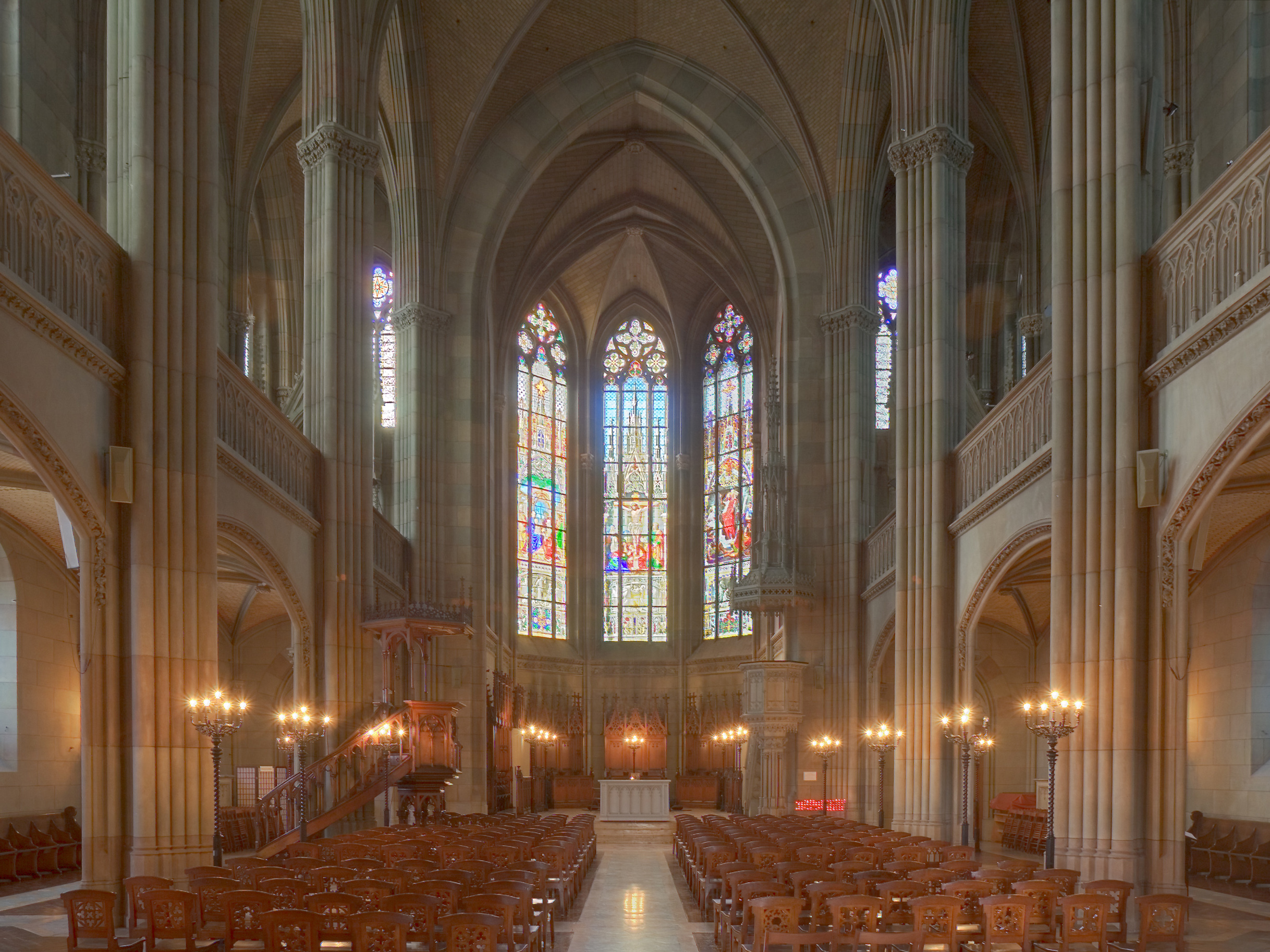
Elisabethenkirche (inside)

Churches and monasteries
Old Catholic Prediger Kirche (church), Bischofshof with Collegiate church at Rittergasse 1, Domhof at Münsterplatz 10–12, former Carthusian House of St Margarethental, Catholic Church of St Antonius, Lohnhof (former Augustinian Collegiate Church), Mission 21, Archive of the Evangelisches Missionswerk Basel, Münster of Basel (cathedral), Reformed Elisabethenkirche (church), Reformed Johanneskirche (church), Reformed Leonhardskirche (church, former Augustinian Abbey), Reformed Martinskirche (church), Reformed Pauluskirche (church), Reformed Peterskirche (church), Reformed St. Albankirche (church) with cloister and cemetery, Reformed Theodorskirche (church), Synagoge at Eulerstrasse 2

Secular buildings

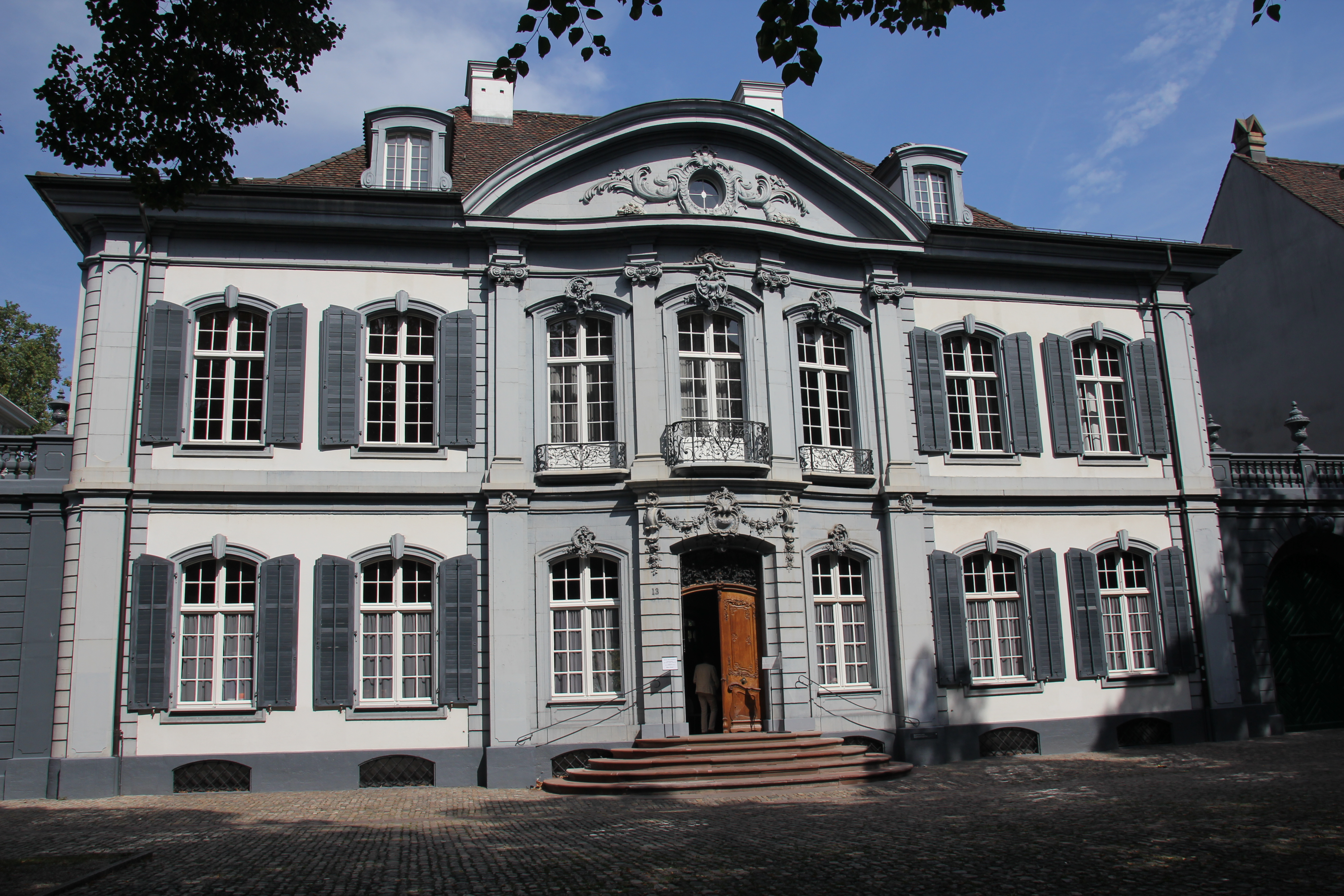
Wildt'sches Haus, Petersplatz

Badischer Bahnhof (German Baden's railway station) with fountain, Bank for International Settlements, Blaues Haus (Reichensteinerhof) at Rheinsprung 16, Bruderholzschule (school house) at Fritz-Hauser-Strasse 20, Brunschwiler Haus at Hebelstrasse 15, Bahnhof Basel SBB (Swiss railway station), Bürgerspital (hospital), Café Spitz (Merianflügel), Coop Schweiz company's central archive, Depot of the Archäologischen Bodenforschung des Kanton Basel-Stadt, former Gallizian Paper Mill and Swiss Museum of Paper, former Klingental-Kaserne (casern) with Klingentaler Kirche (church), Fasnachtsbrunnen (fountain), Feuerschützenhaus (guild house of the riflemen) at Schützenmattstrasse 56, Fischmarktbrunnen (fountain), Geltenzunft at Marktplatz 13, Gymnasium am Kohlenberg (St Leonhard) (school), Hauptpost (main post office), Haus zum Raben at Aeschenvorstadt 15, Hohenfirstenhof at Rittergasse 19, Holsteinerhof at Hebelstrasse 30, Markgräflerhof a former palace of the margraves of Baden-Durlach, Mittlere Rhein Brücke (Central Rhine Bridge), Stadtcasino (music hall) at Steinenberg 14, Ramsteinerhof at Rittergasse 7 and 9, Rathaus (town hall), Rundhof building of the Schweizerischen Mustermesse, Safranzunft at Gerbergasse 11, Sandgrube at Riehenstrasse 154, Schlösschen (Manor house) Gundeldingen, Schönes Haus and Schöner Hof at Nadelberg 6, Wasgenring school house, Seidenhof with painting of Rudolf von Habsburg, Spalenhof at Spalenberg 12, Spiesshof at Heuberg 7, city walls, Townhouse (former post office) at Stadthausgasse 13 / Totengässlein 6, Weisses Haus at Martinsgasse 3, Wildt'sches Haus at Petersplatz 13, Haus zum Neuen Singer at Speiserstrasse 98, Wolfgottesacker at Münchensteinerstrasse 99, Zerkindenhof at Nadelberg 10.

Archaeological sites
The Celtic Settlement at Gasfabrik, Münsterhügel and Altstadt (historical city, late La Tène and medieval settlement).

Museums, archives and collections
Basel calls itself the Cultural Capital of Switzerland.

Among others, there is the Anatomical Museum of the University Basel, Berri-Villen and Museum of Ancient Art Basel and Ludwig Collection, Former Franciscan Barefoot Order Church and Basel Historical Museum, Company Archive of Novartis, Haus zum Kirschgarten which is part of the Basel Historical Museum, Historic Archive Roche and Industrial Complex Hoffmann-La Roche, Jewish Museum of Switzerland, Caricature & Cartoon Museum Basel, Karl Barth-Archive, Kleines Klingental (Lower Klingen Valley) with Museum Klingental, Art Museum of Basel, hosting the world's oldest art collection accessible to the public, Natural History Museum of Basel and the Museum of Cultures Basel, Museum of Modern Art Basel with the E. Hoffmann collection, Museum Jean Tinguely Basel, Music Museum, Pharmacy Historical Museum of the University of Basel, Poster Collection of the School for Design (Schule für Gestaltung), Swiss Business Archives, Sculpture Hall, Sports Museum of Switzerland, Archives of the Canton of Basel-Stadt, UBS AG Corporate Archives, University Library with manuscripts and music collection, Zoological Garden (Zoologischer Garten).

=== Theatre and music ===
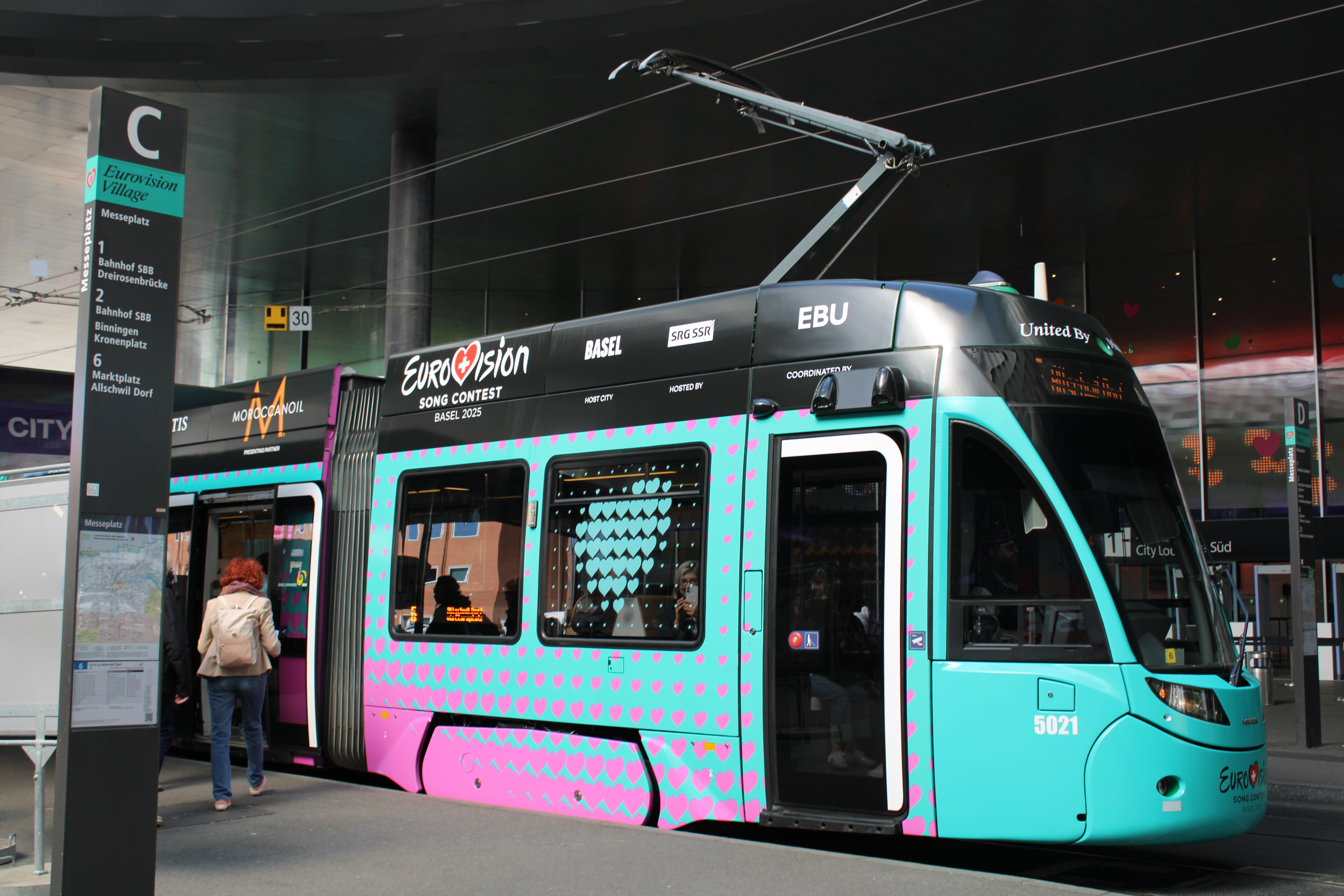
Metro decor for the Eurovision Song Contest 2025

Basel is the home of the Schola Cantorum Basiliensis, founded in 1933, a worldwide centre for research on and performance of music from the Medieval through the Baroque eras. Theater Basel, chosen in 1999 as the best stage for German-language performances and in 2009 and 2010 as "Opera house of the year" by German opera magazine Opernwelt, presents a busy schedule of plays in addition to being home to the city's opera and ballet companies. Basel is home to the largest orchestra in Switzerland, the Sinfonieorchester Basel. It is also the home of the Basel Sinfonietta and the Kammerorchester Basel, which recorded the complete symphonies of Ludwig van Beethoven for the Sony label, led by its music director Giovanni Antonini. The Schola Cantorum and the Basler Kammerorchester were both founded by the conductor Paul Sacher, who went on to commission works by many leading composers. The Paul Sacher Foundation, opened in 1986, houses a major collection of manuscripts, including the entire Igor Stravinsky archive. The baroque orchestras La Cetra and Capriccio Basel are also based in Basel.

In May 2004, the fifth European Festival of Youth Choirs (Europäisches Jugendchorfestival, or EJCF) opened; this Basel tradition started in 1992. Host of the festival is the local Basel Boys Choir.

In 1997, Basel contended to become the "European Capital of Culture", though the honor went to Thessaloniki.

In 2025, Basel hosted the 69th edition of the Eurovision Song Contest at St. Jakobshalle, becoming the third Swiss city to host the song competition after Lugano in 1956 and Lausanne in 1989.

=== Museums ===
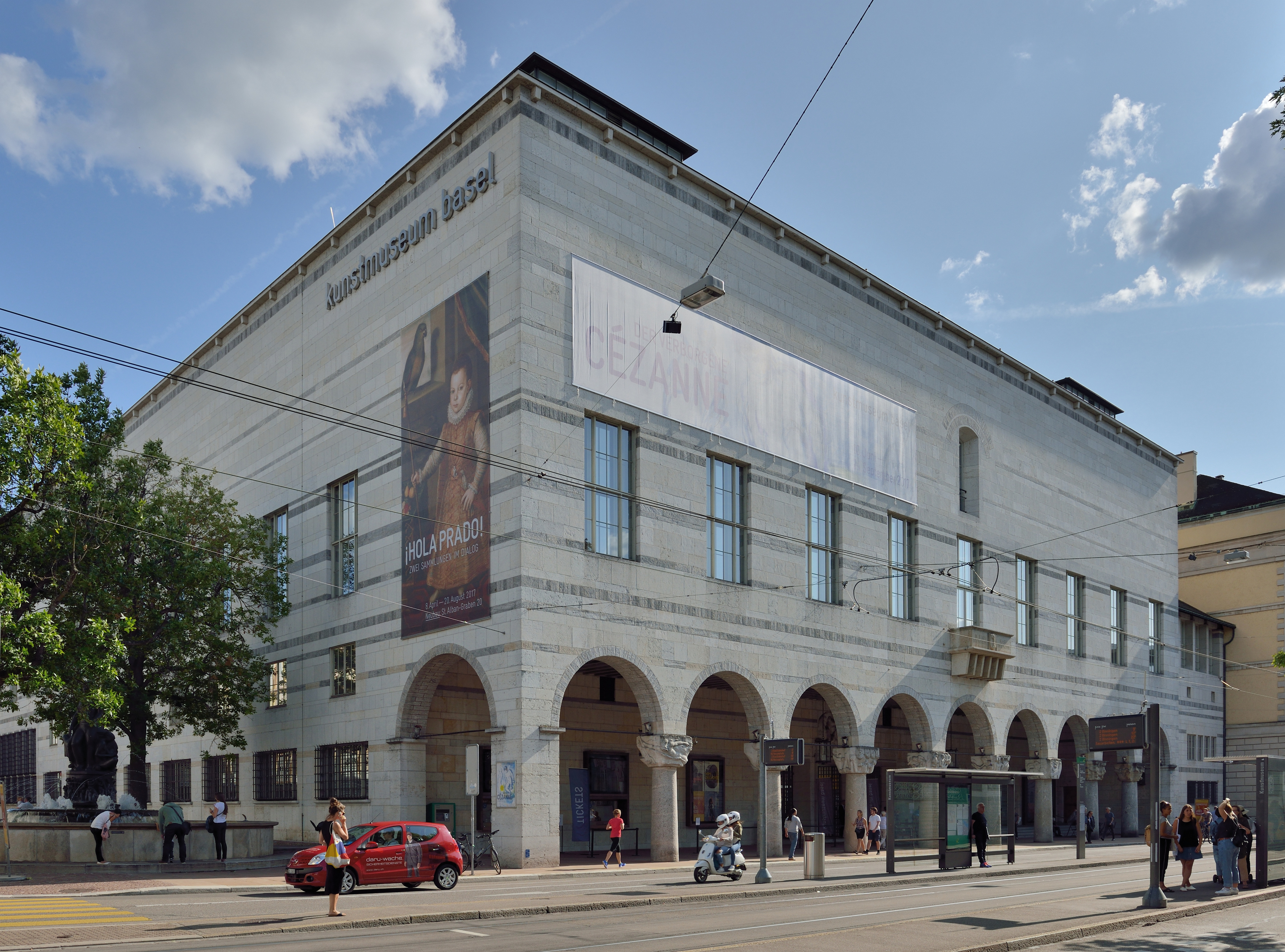
The Kunstmuseum Basel, oldest public museum of art in Europe

The Basel museums cover a broad and diverse spectrum of collections with a marked concentration in the fine arts. They house holdings of international significance. The over three dozen institutions yield an high density of museums compared to other cities of similar size and draw over one million visitors annually.

Constituting an essential component of Basel culture and cultural policy, the museums are the result of closely interwoven private and public collecting activities and promotion of arts and culture going back to the 16th century. The public museum collection was first created back in 1661 and represents the oldest public collection in continuous existence in Europe. Since the late 1980s, various private collections have been made accessible to the public in new purpose-built structures that have been recognized as acclaimed examples of avant-garde museum architecture.

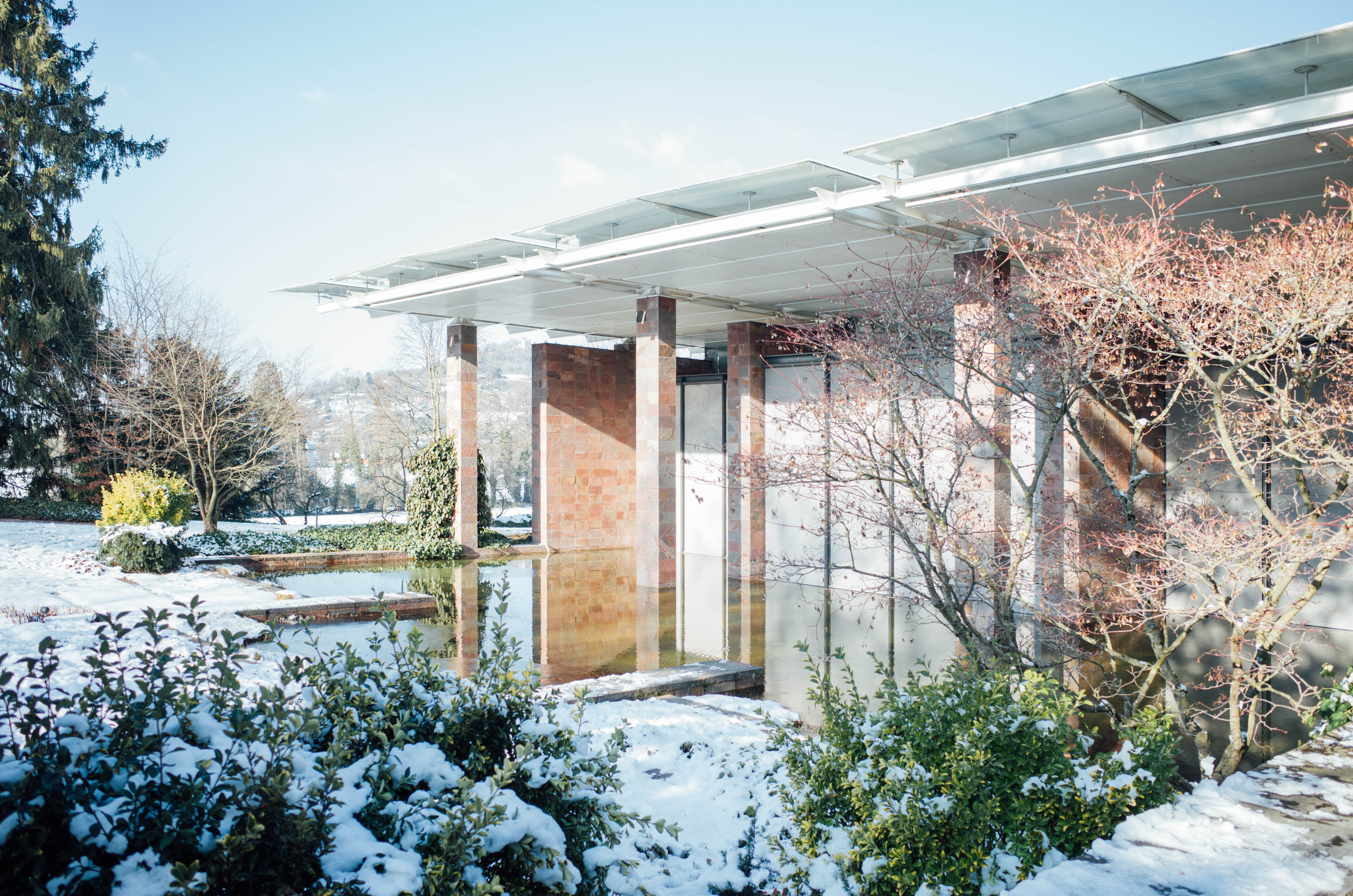
The Fondation Beyeler by Renzo Piano, located in Riehen

- Antikenmuseum Basel und Sammlung Ludwig Ancient cultures of the Mediterranean museum
- Augusta Raurica Roman open-air museum
- Basel Paper Mill (German: Basler Papiermühle)
- Beyeler Foundation (Foundation Beyeler)
- Botanical Garden Basel
- Caricature & Cartoon Museum Basel (German: Karikatur & Cartoon Museum Basel)
- Dollhouse Museum (German: Puppenhausmuseum) a museum housing the largest teddy bear collection in Europe.
- Foundation Fernet Branca (French: Fondation Fernet Branca) in Saint-Louis, Haut-Rhin near Basel. Modern art collection.
- Historical Museum Basel (German: Historisches Museum Basel)
- Kunsthalle Basel Modern and contemporary art museum
- Kunstmuseum Basel Upper Rhenish and Flemish paintings, drawings from 1400 to 1600 and 19th- to 21st-century art
- Monteverdi Automuseum
- Museum of Cultures Basel (German: Museum der Kulturen Basel) Large collections on European and non-European cultural life
- Museum of Contemporary Art Art from the 1960s up to the present
- Music Museum (German: Musikmuseum) of the Basel Historic Museum
- Natural History Museum of Basel (German: Naturhistorisches Museum Basel)
- Pharmazie-Historisches Museum der Universität Basel
- Schaulager Modern and contemporary art museum
- Swiss Architecture Museum (German: Schweizerisches Architekturmuseum)
- Tinguely Museum Life and work of the major Swiss iron sculptor Jean Tinguely
- Jewish Museum of Switzerland

=== Events ===
The city of Basel is a centre for numerous fairs and events all year round. One of the most important fairs for contemporary art worldwide is the Art Basel which was founded in 1970 by Ernst Beyeler and takes place in June each year. Baselworld, the watch and jewellery show (Uhren- und Schmuckmesse) one of the biggest fairs of its kind in Europe was held every year as well, and attracted a great number of tourists and dealers to the city, last happened in 2019 and is now cancelled. Live marketing company and fair organizer MCH Group has its head office in Basel.

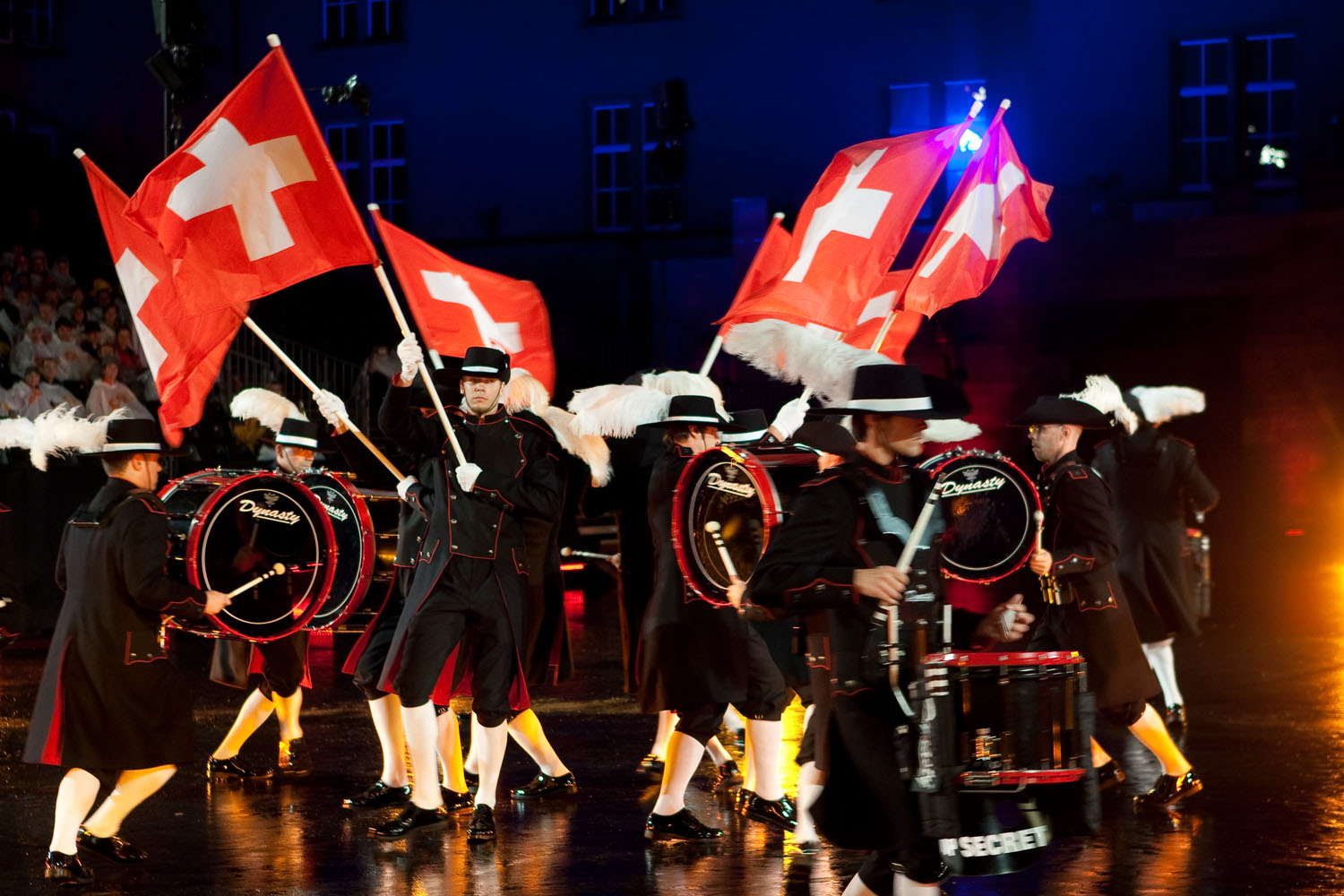
Top Secret Drum Corps at the 2009 Basel Tattoo

The carnival of the city of Basel (Basler Fasnacht) is a major cultural event in the year. The carnival is the biggest in Switzerland and attracts large crowds every year, despite the fact that it starts at exactly four o'clock in the morning (Morgestraich) on a winter Monday. The Fasnacht asserts Basel's Protestant history by commencing the revelry five days after Ash Wednesday and continuing exactly 72 hours. Almost all study and work in the old city cease. Dozens of fife and drum clubs parade in medieval guild tradition with fantastical masks and illuminated lanterns.

Basel Tattoo, founded in 2006 by the local Top Secret Drum Corps, has grown to be the world's second largest military tattoo in terms of performers and budget after the Edinburgh Military Tattoo. The Basel Tattoo annual parade, with an estimated 125,000 visitors, is considered the largest event in Basel. The event is now sponsored by the Swiss Federal Department of Defence, Civil Protection and Sport (DDPS), making it the official military tattoo of Switzerland.

=== Cuisine ===
There are a number of culinary specialties originating in Basel, including Basler Läckerli cookies and Mässmogge candies. Being located in the meeting place between Switzerland, France and Germany the culinary landscape as a whole is varied and diverse, making it a city with a number of restaurants of all sorts.

=== Zoo ===
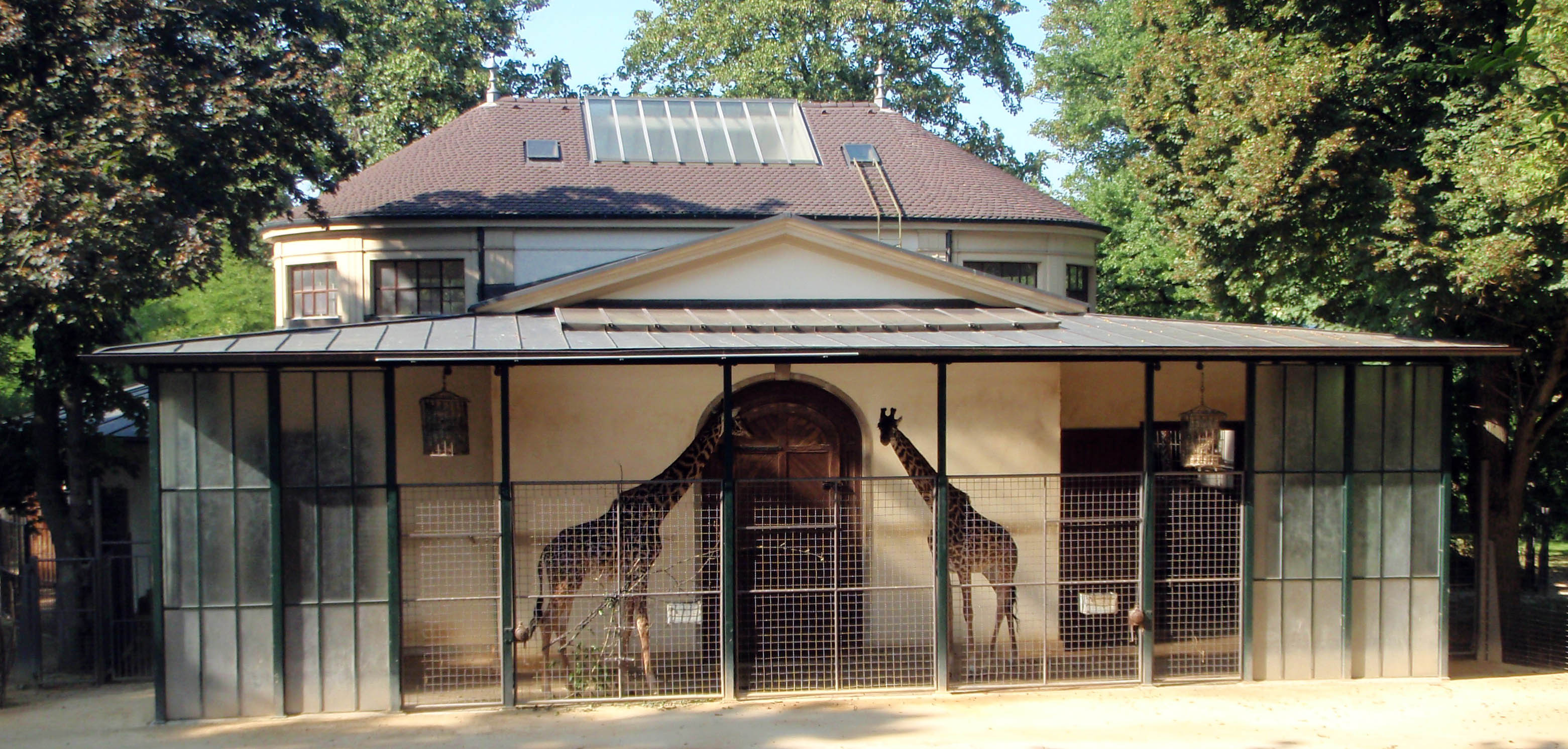
The Antelope House at Zoo Basel

Zoo Basel is, with over 1.7 million visitors per year, the most visited tourist attraction in Basel and the second most visited tourist attraction in Switzerland.

Established in 1874, Zoo Basel is the oldest zoo in Switzerland and, by number of animals, the largest. Through its history, Zoo Basel has had several breeding successes, such as the first worldwide Indian rhinoceros birth and Greater flamingo hatch in a zoo. These and other achievements led Forbes Travel to rank Zoo Basel as one of the fifteen best zoos in the world in 2008.

Despite its international fame, Basel's population remains attached to Zoo Basel, which is entirely surrounded by the city of Basel. Evidence of this is the millions of donations money each year, as well as Zoo Basel's unofficial name: locals lovingly call "their" zoo "Zolli" by which is it known throughout Basel and most of Switzerland.

=== Sport ===
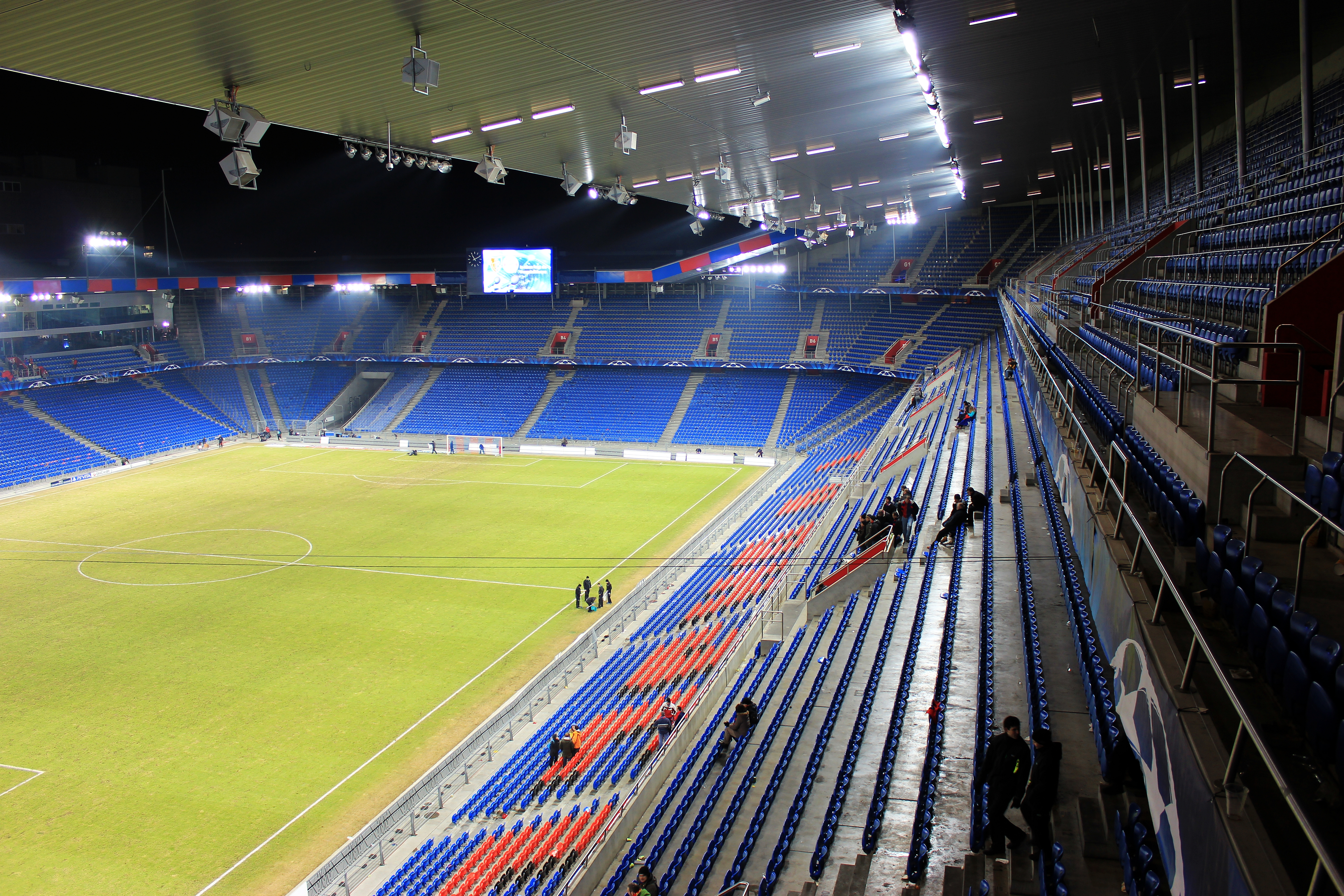
St. Jakob-Park

Amongst its major sports venues, Basel features a large football stadium that has been awarded four stars by UEFA, a modern ice hockey arena, and a sports hall.

The football club FC Basel is successful and in recognition of this the city was one of the Swiss venues for the 2008 European Championships, along with Geneva, Zürich and Bern. The championships were jointly hosted by Switzerland and Austria. BSC Old Boys and Concordia Basel are the other football teams in Basel.

Among the most popular sports in Switzerland is ice hockey. Basel is home to EHC Basel, who play in the Swiss League (SL), the second tier of the Swiss ice hockey league system. They play their home games in the 6,700-seater St. Jakob Arena. The team previously played in the National League but filed for bankruptcy after the 2013–14 Swiss League season.

Basketball has a very small but faithful fan base. The top division, called the SBL, is a semi-professional league and has one team from the Basel region, the "Birstal Starwings". As in most European countries, but unlike the U.S., Switzerland has a club-based rather than a school-based competition system. The Starwings Basel are the only first division basketball team in German-speaking Switzerland.

A large indoor tennis event takes place in Basel every October. Some of the best ATP-professionals play every year at the Swiss Indoors, previously including Switzerland's biggest sporting hero Roger Federer, a Basel native who describes the city as "one of the most beautiful cities in the world".

In July 2022, the women's water polo players of the WSV Basel secured their 11th national championship title.

Basel GAA, a Gaelic games club, is also located in Basel. Basel Dragons AFC have been playing Australian Football in the AFL Switzerland league since 2019.

The annual Basel Rhine Swim draws several thousand visitors to the city to swim in or float on the Rhine.

The headquarters of the IHF (International Handball Federation) is located in Basel.

== Notable people ==
Notable people who were born or grew up in Basel:

- Gaspard Bauhin (1560–1624), botanist and anatomist
- Matthäus Merian the Elder (1593–1650), engraver
- Johannes Buxtorf II (1599–1664), Protestant Christian Hebraist
- Johannes Jakob Buxtorf (1645–1705), professor of Hebrew
- Jacob Bernoulli (1654–1705), mathematician
- Johann Bernoulli (1667–1748), mathematician
- Johann Jakob Wettstein (1693–1754), theologian and New Testament critic
- Daniel Bernoulli (1700–1782), mathematician and physicist, best known for his work in fluid dynamics, see Bernoulli's principle
- Maximilian Ulysses Browne (1705–1757), Austrian field marshal
- Leonhard Euler (1707–1783), mathematician, physicist and astronomer
- Johann Peter Hebel (1760–1826), German short story writer, poet and Lutheran theologian
- Johann Jakob Herzog (1805–1882), Swiss-German Protestant theologian
- Jacob Burckhardt (1818–1897), historian of art and culture
- Arnold Böcklin (1827–1901), symbolist painter
- Friedrich Miescher (1844–1895), physician and biologist, the first scientist to isolate nucleic acid
- Rudolf G. Binding (1867–1938), German writer
- Karl Barth (1886–1968), Swiss Reformed theologian, best known for his involvement with the Confessing Church and Christian resistance to Hitler
- Bruno Manser (born 1954), activist who disappeared or died in 2005
- Richard J. Baer (1892–1940), physicist
- Véronique Filozof (1904–1977), painter
- Clara Thalmann (1908–1987), journalist, athlete, and militiawoman
- Harry Goldschmidt (1910–1986), musicologist
- Rudy Burckhardt (1914–1999), American filmmaker and photographer
- Avraham Yaakov Finkel (1926–2016), author
- Arthur Cohn (born 1927), film producer and multiple Academy Award winner
- Marion Wiesel (born Mary Renate Erster; 1931–2025), Austrian-American Holocaust survivor, humanitarian, and translator
- Christa de Carouge (1936–2018), fashion designer
- Peter Zumthor (born 1943), architect
- Margrith von Felten (born 1944), politician and lawyer
- Heidi Köpfer (born 1954), choreographer, dancer and video artist
- Carlo Strenger (1958–2019), Swiss-Israeli psychologist, philosopher, existential psychoanalyst, and public intellectual
- Christina Surer (born 1974), racing driver
- Antoine Konrad (born 1975), DJ and record producer, known as DJ Antoine
- Martina Gmür (born 1979), visual artist
- Roger Federer (born 1981), professional tennis player
- Granit Xhaka (born 1992), professional footballer with 100 caps with Switzerland
- Fina Girard (born 2001), politician and youth climate activist

== Picture gallery ==
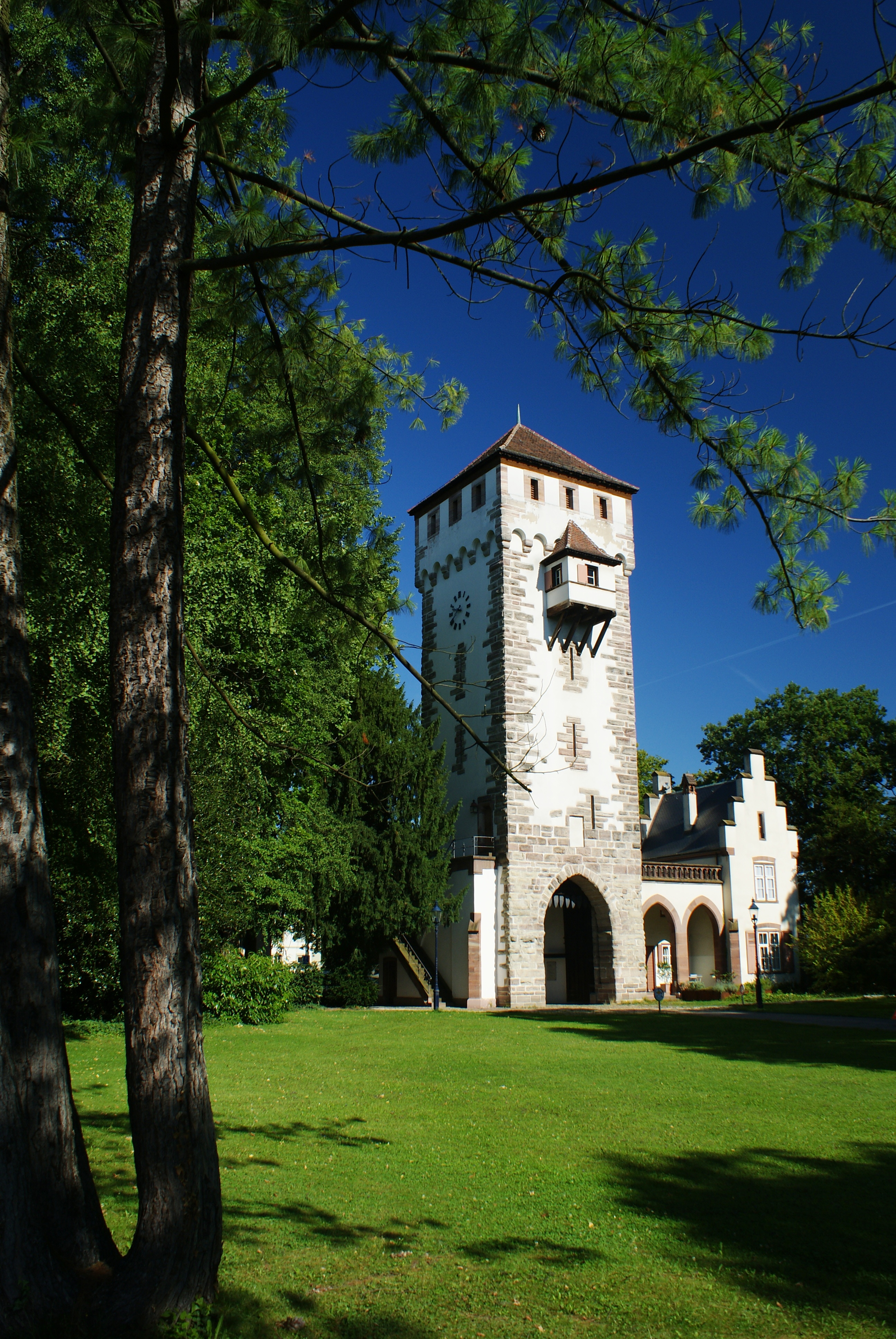
St. Alban Gate

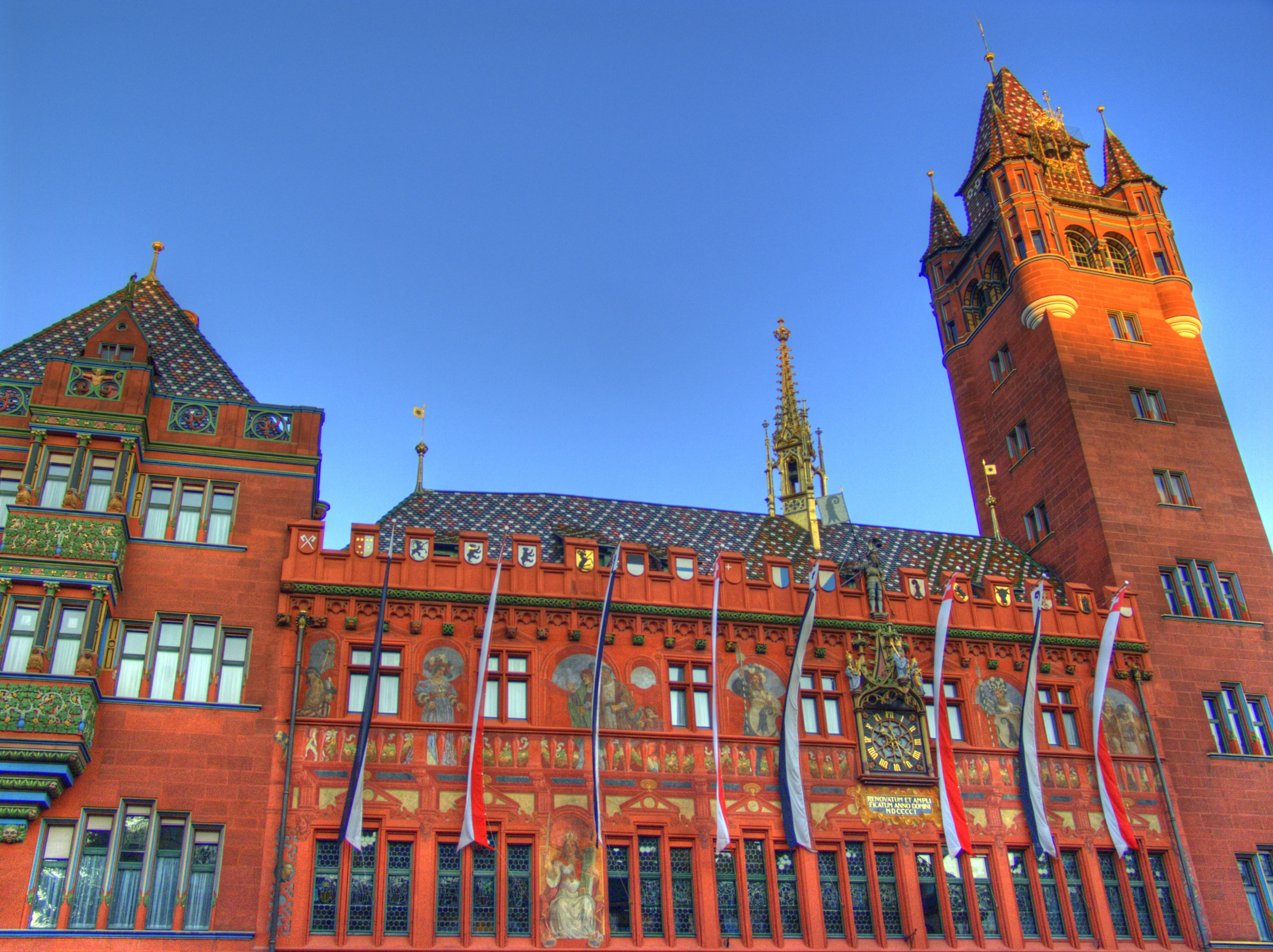
Rathaus, Basel's Town Hall

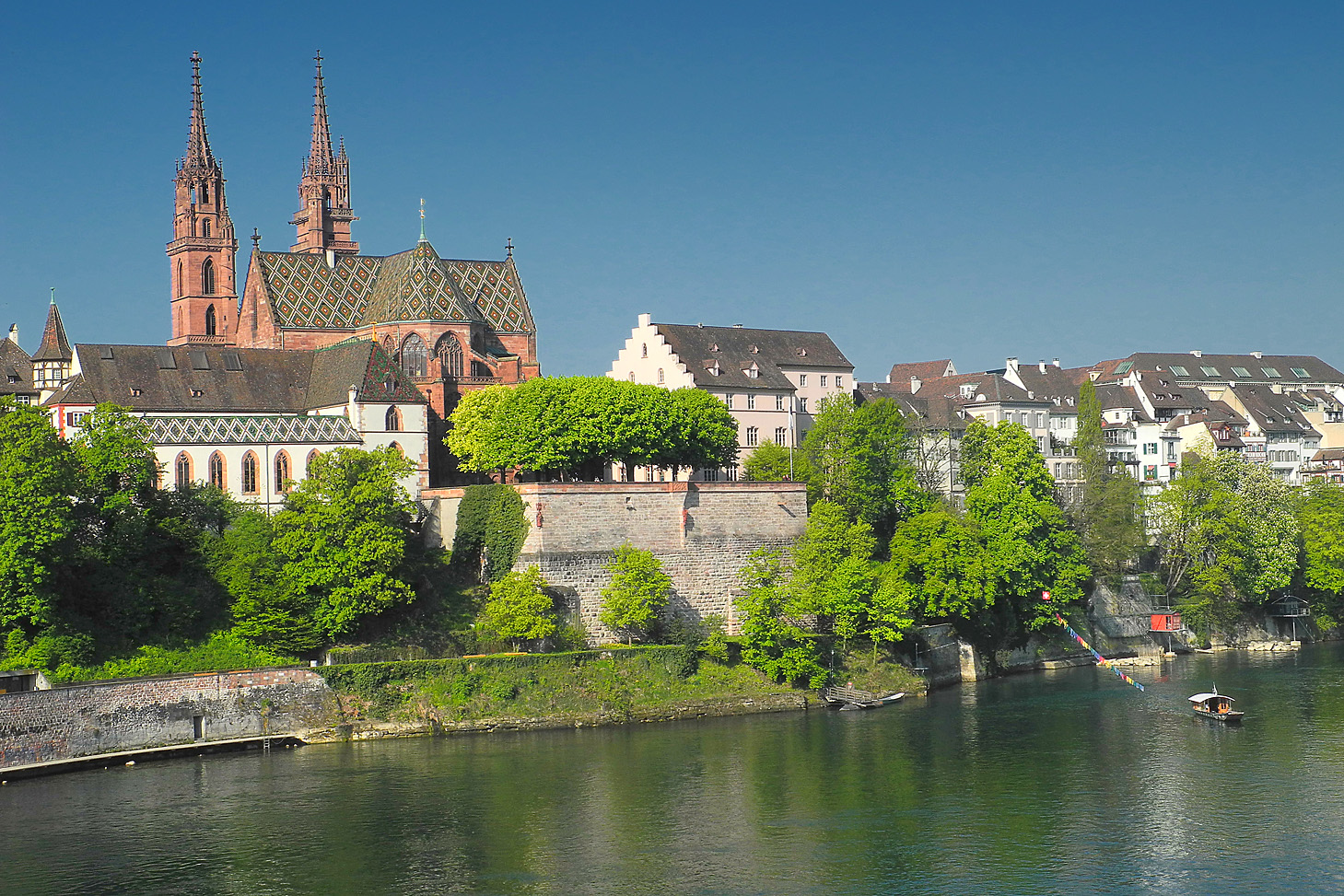
Protestant Cathedral

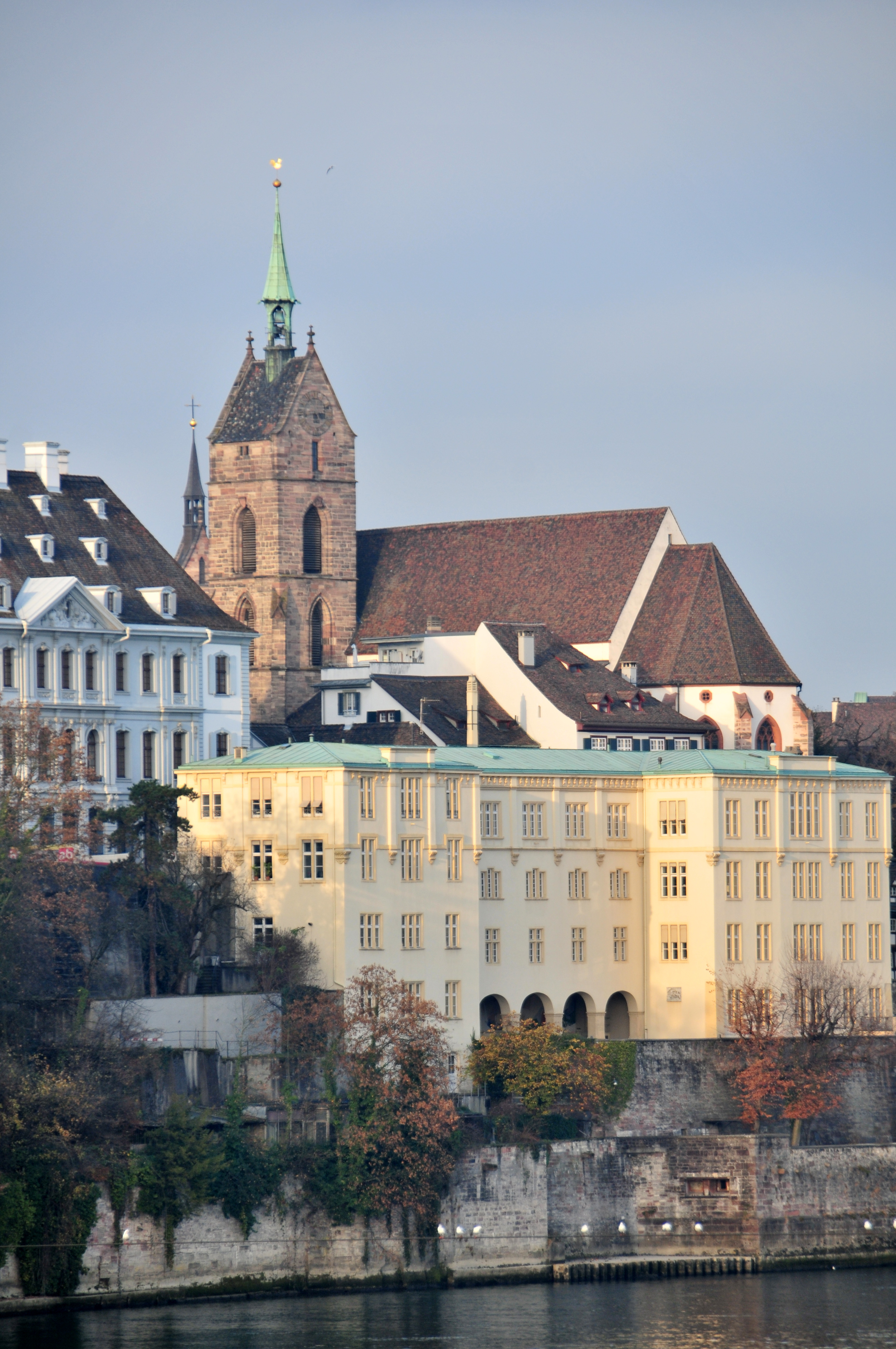
University of Basel (est. in 1460) and Martinskirche

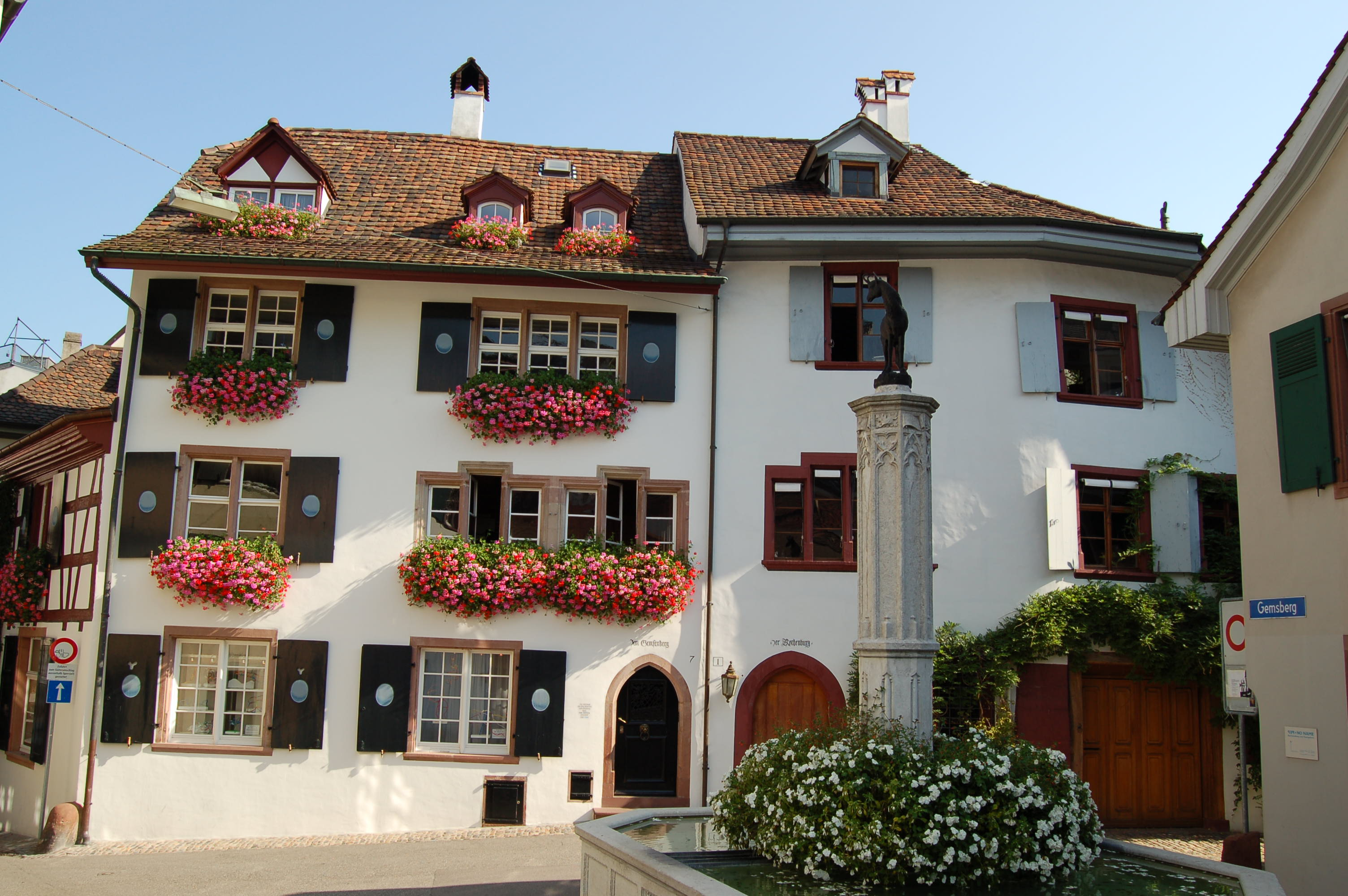
Gemsberg

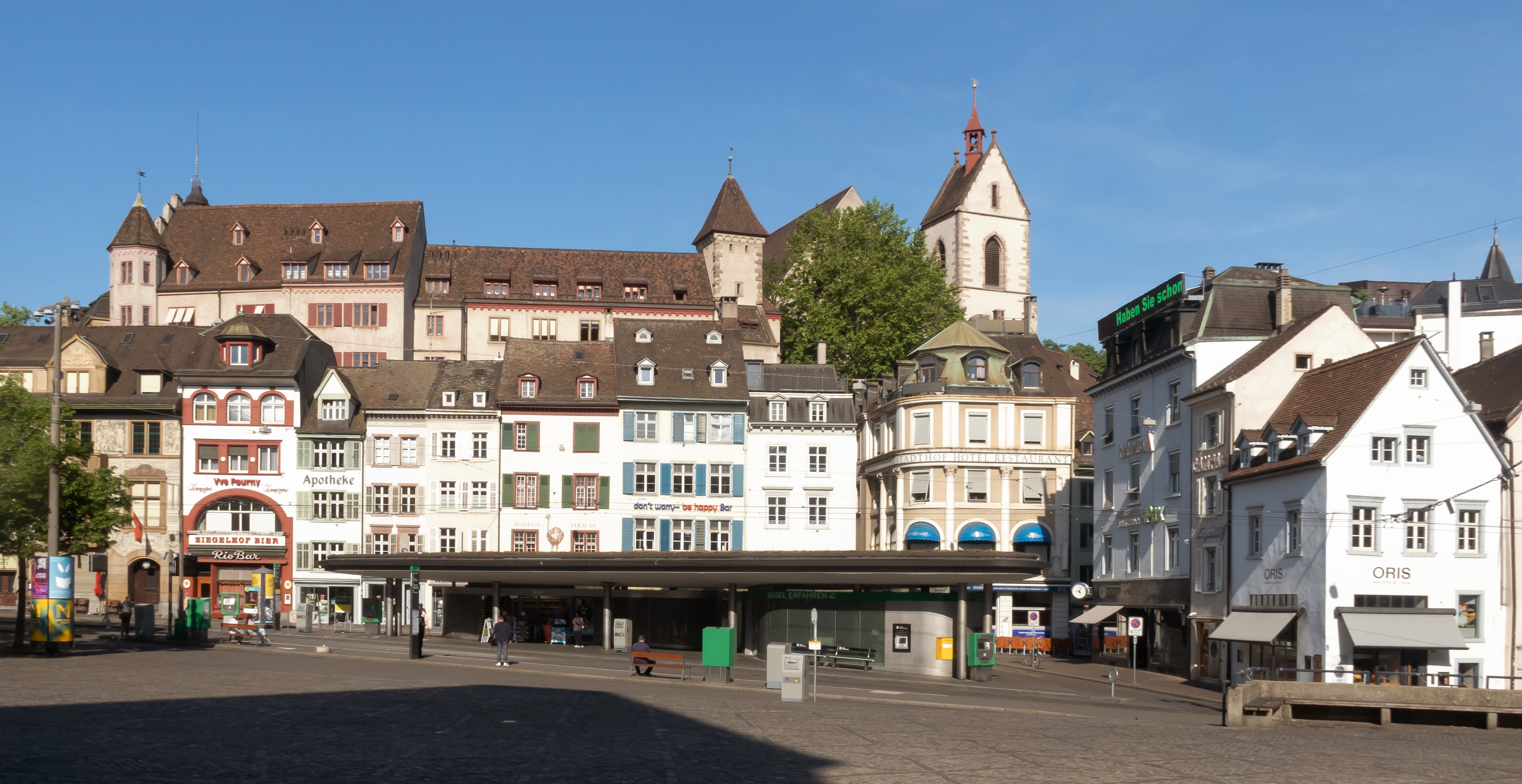
Barfüsserplatz

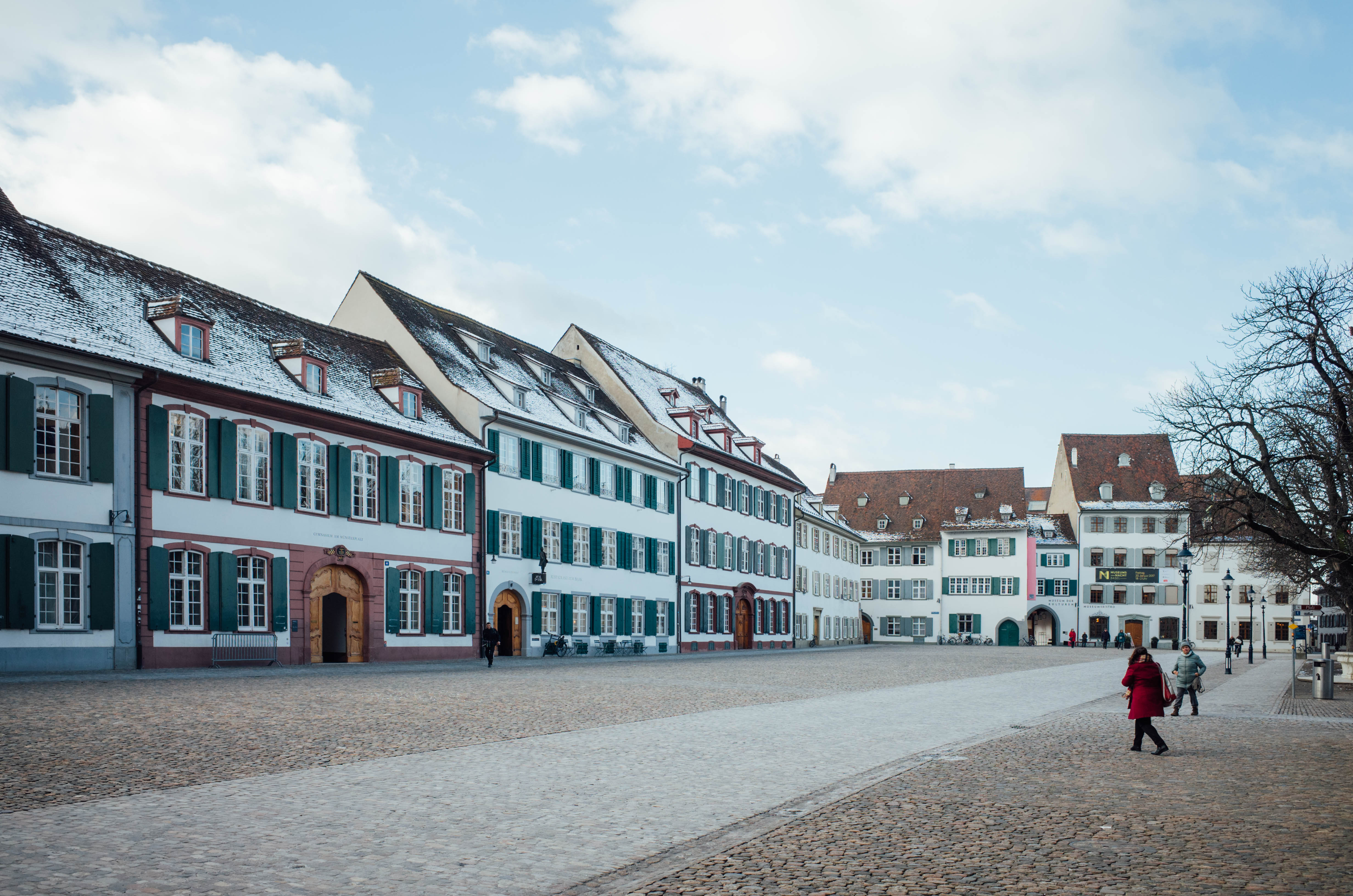
Münsterplatz

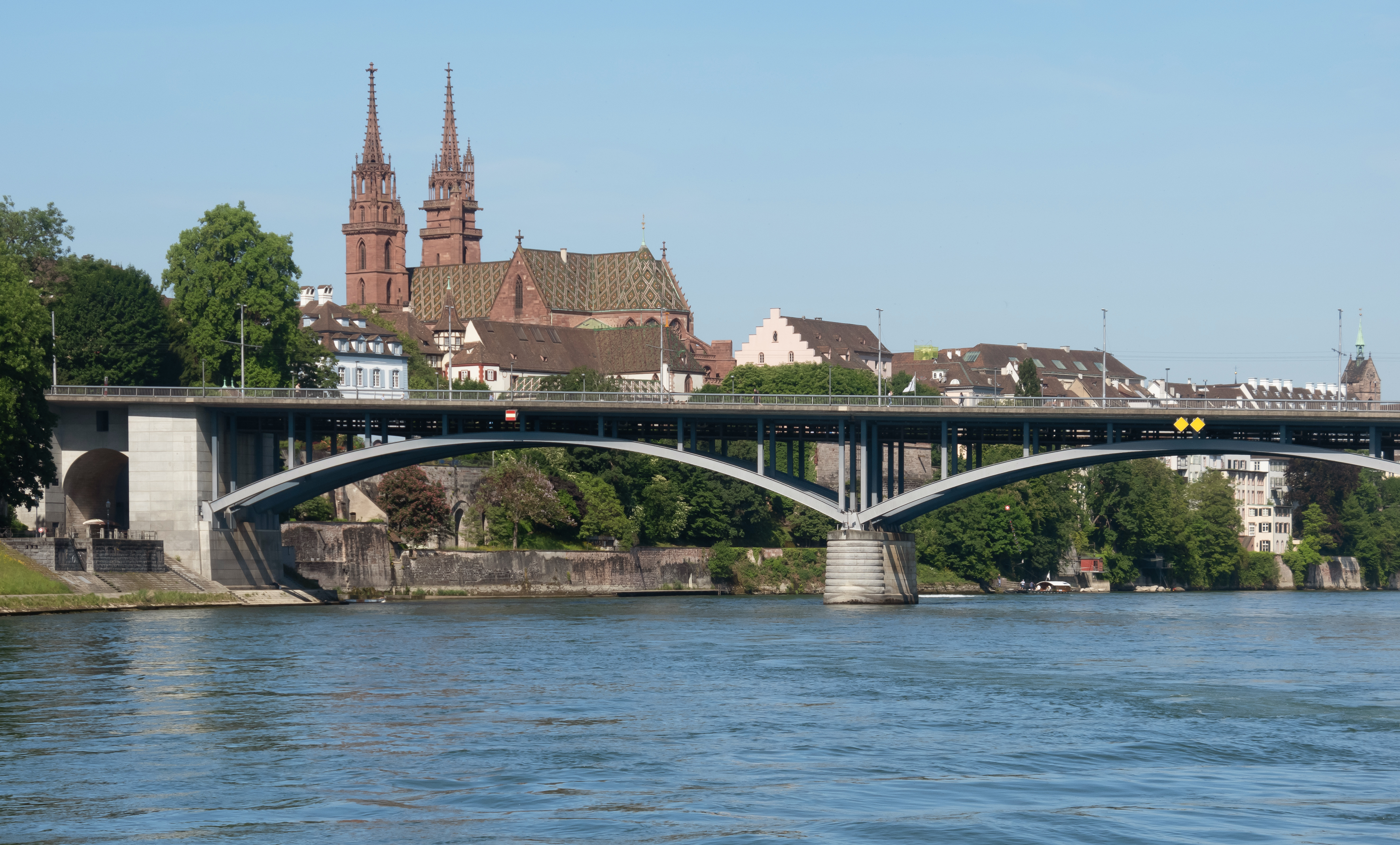
Wettsteinbrücke

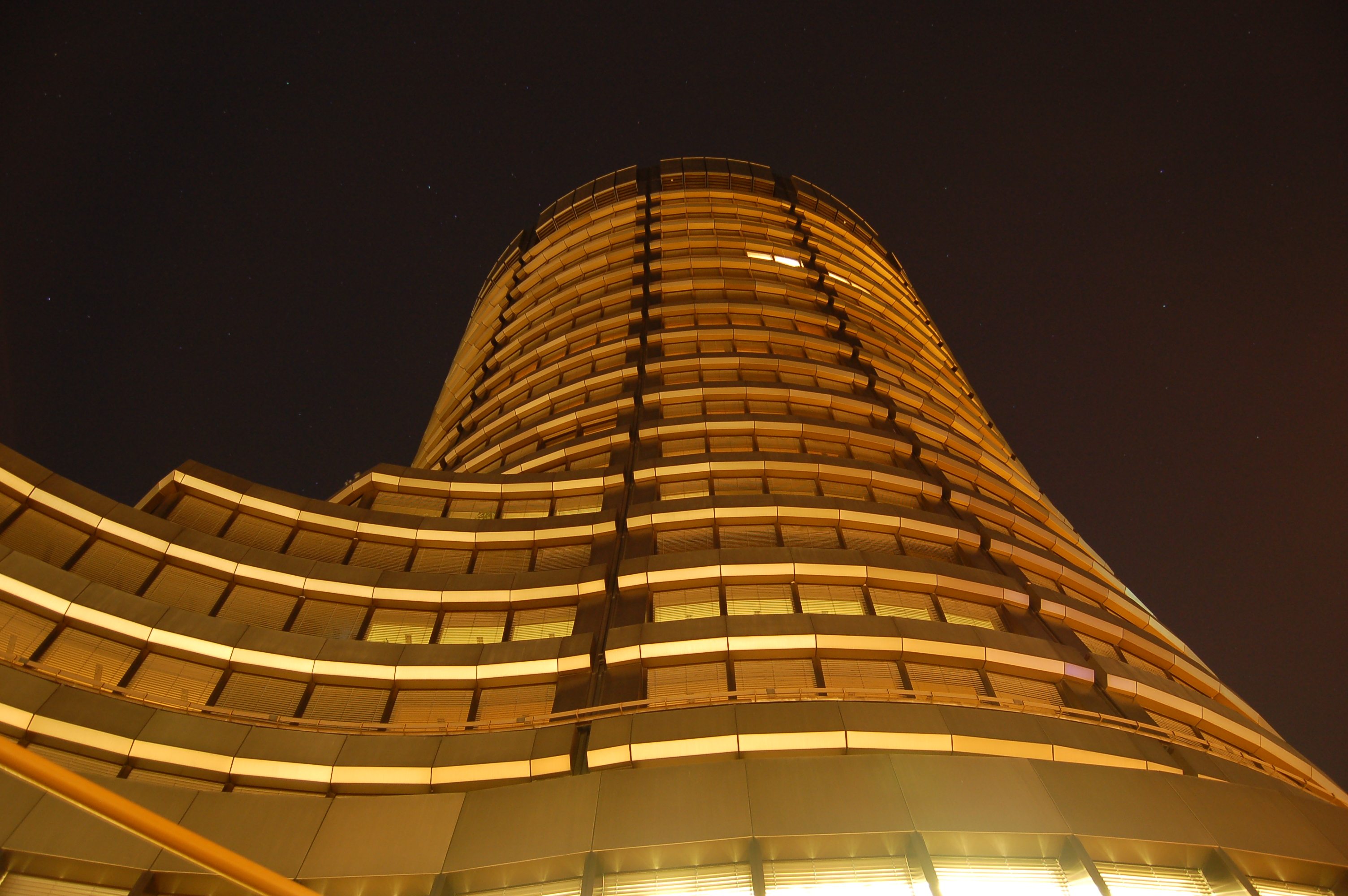
Global seat of the Bank for International Settlements

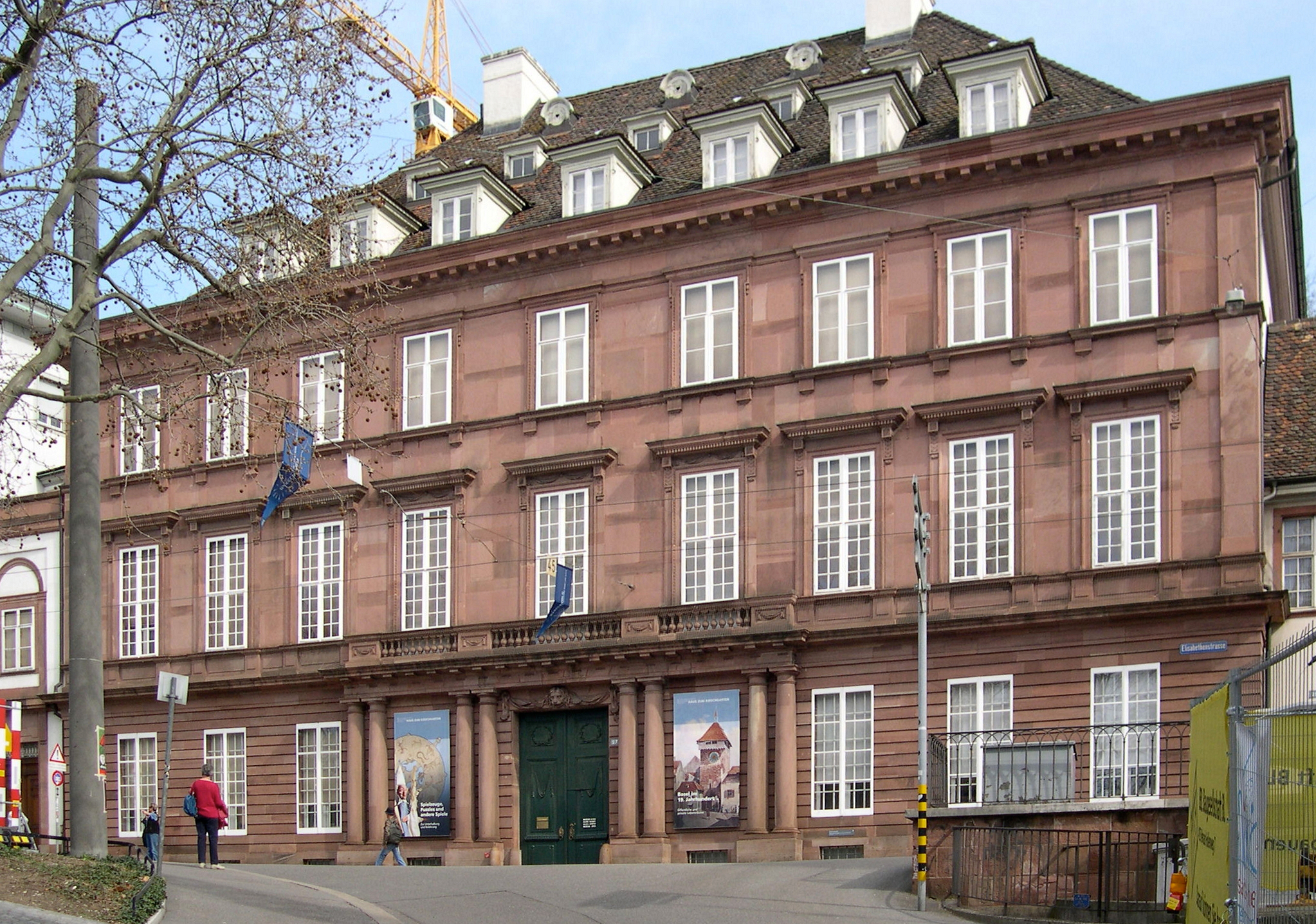
Haus zum Kirschgarten

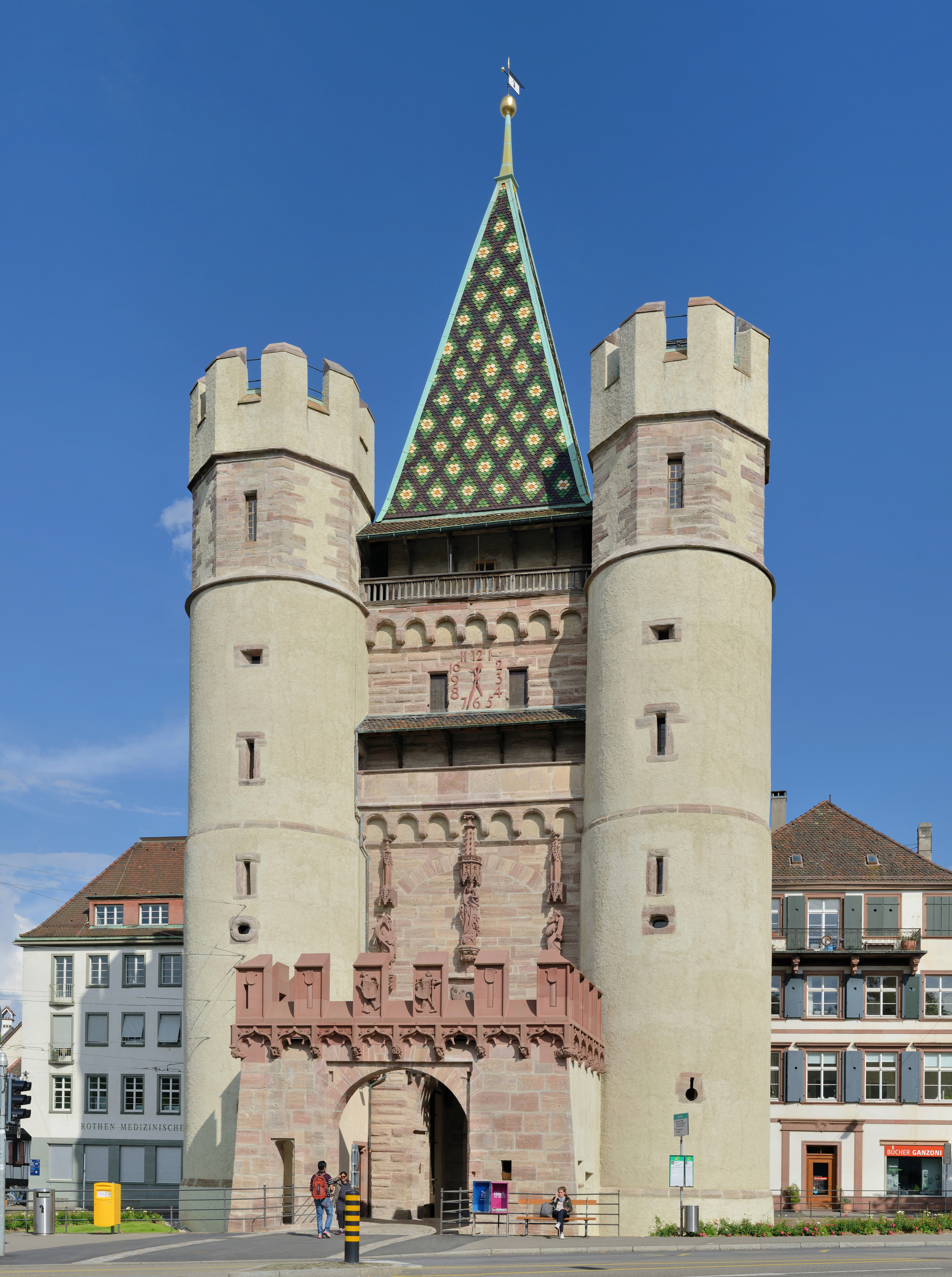
Spalentor

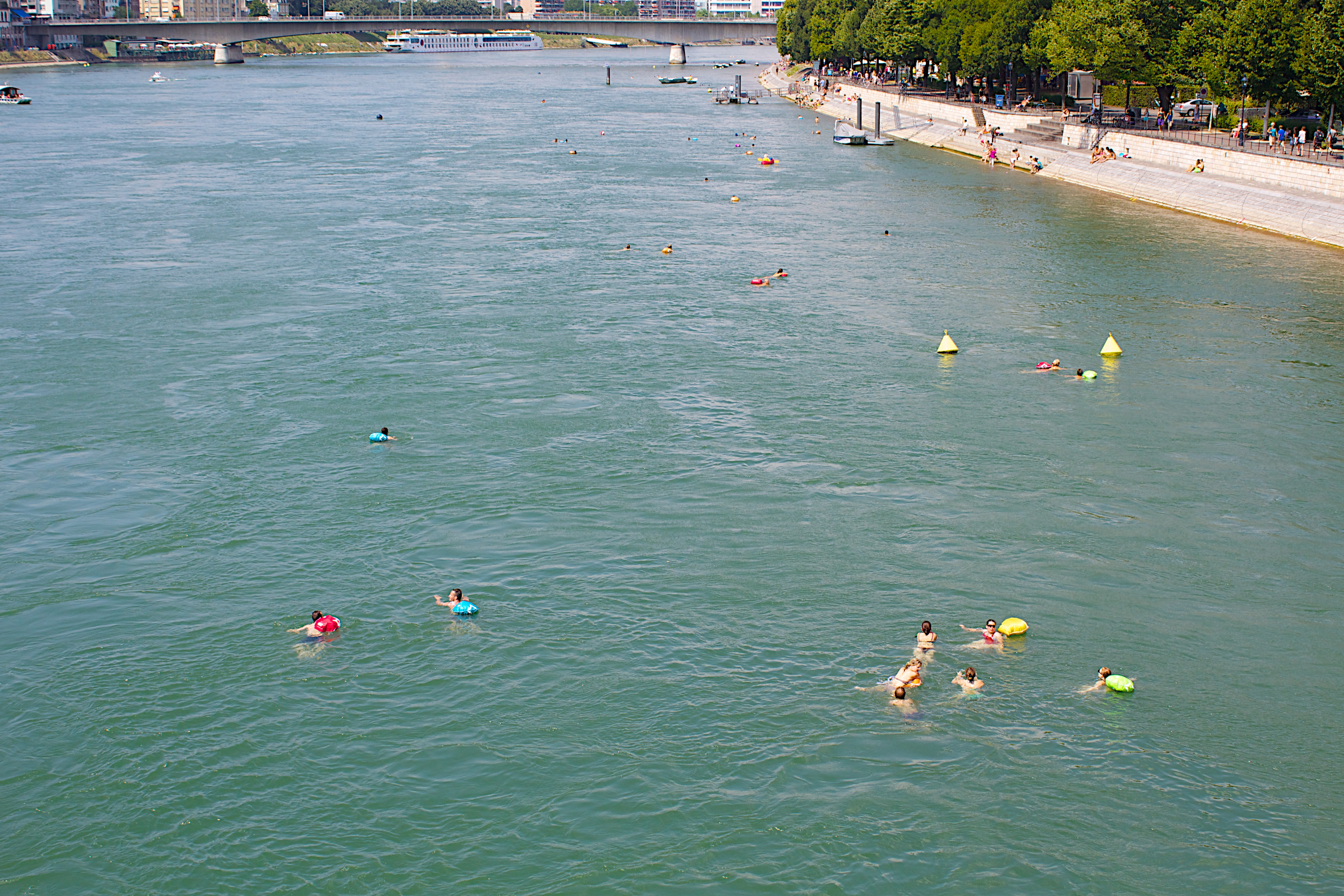
People swimming in the Rhine

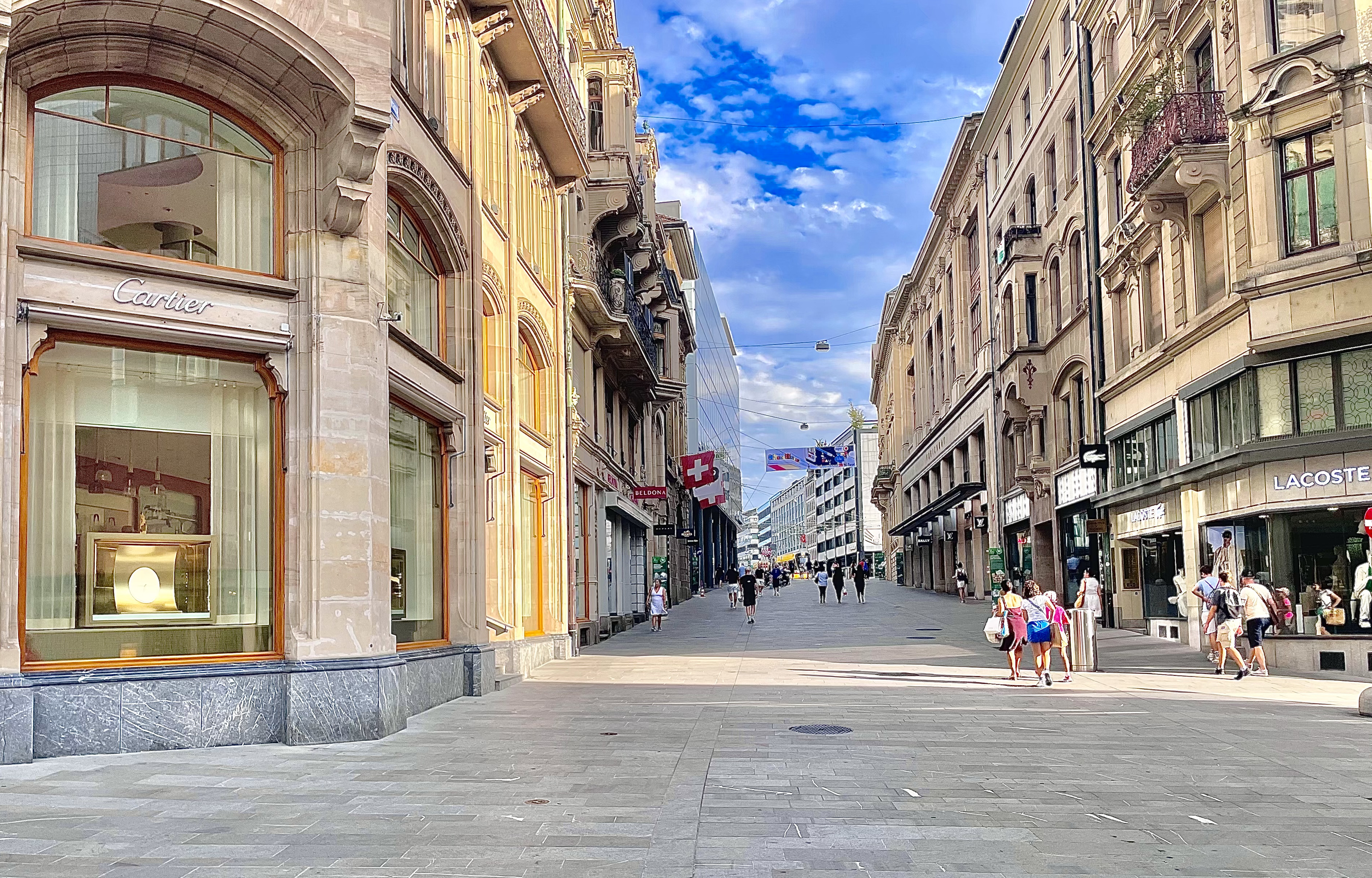
Freie Strasse

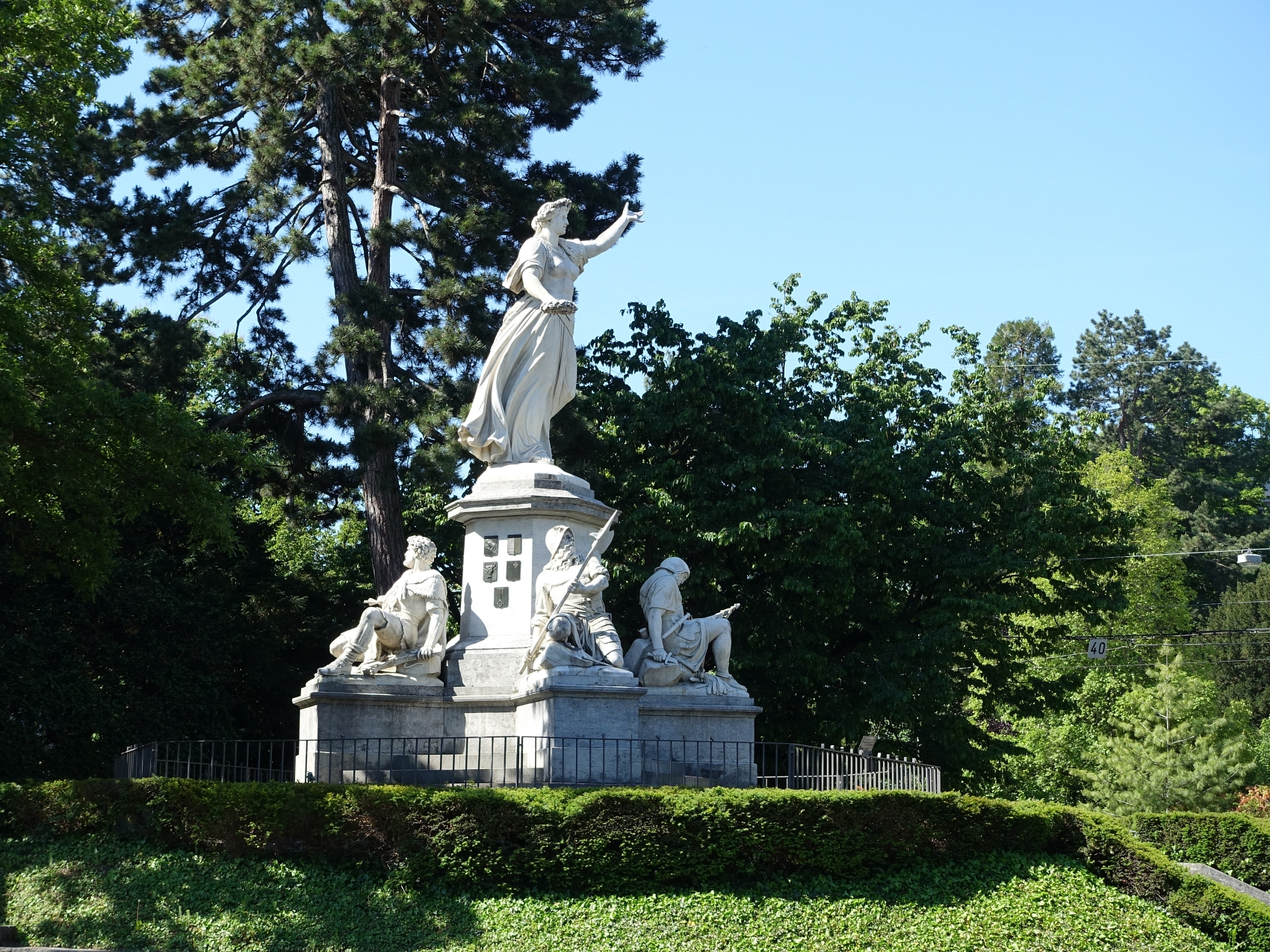
Helvetia statue

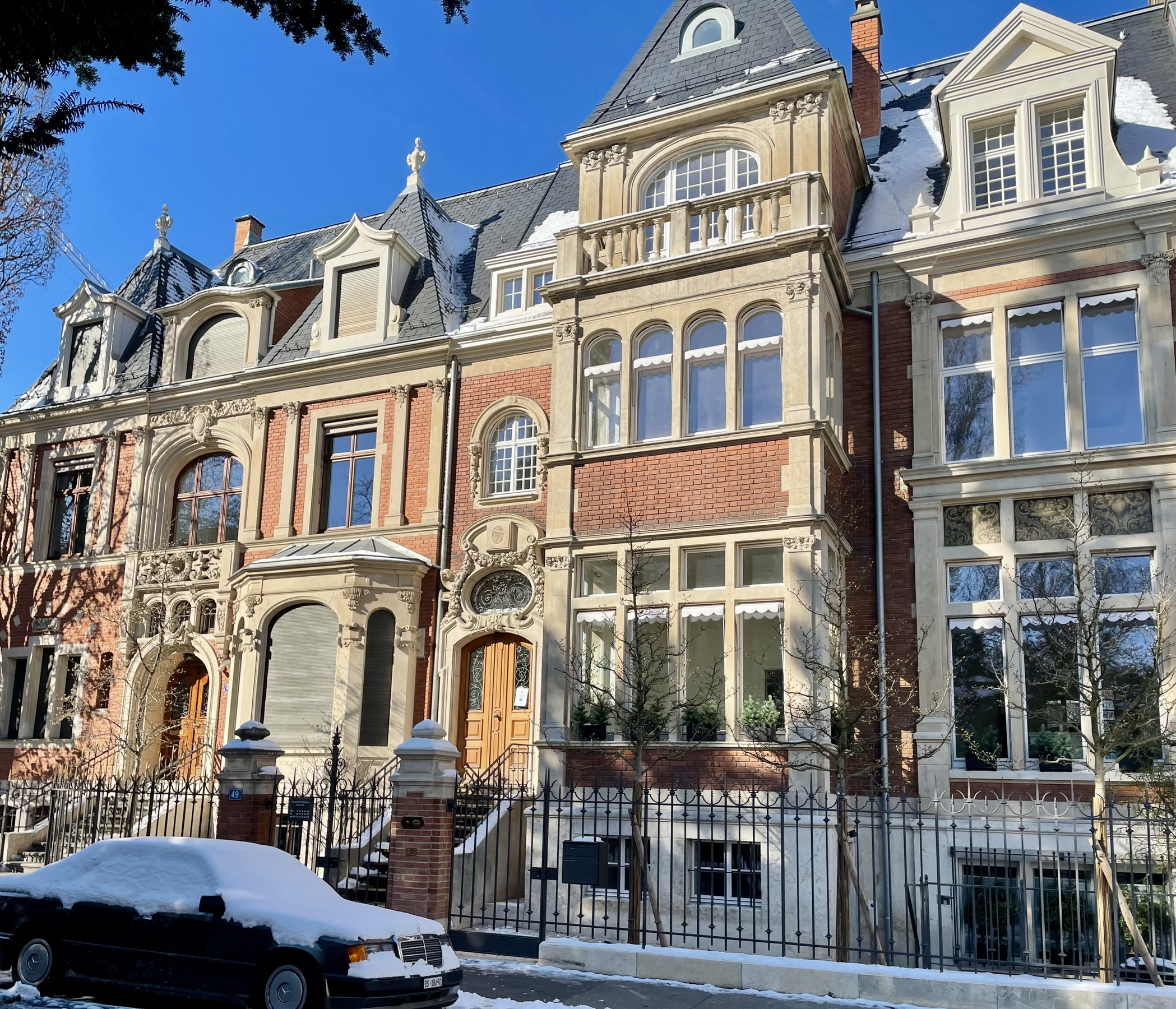
Townhouses (early 20th century)

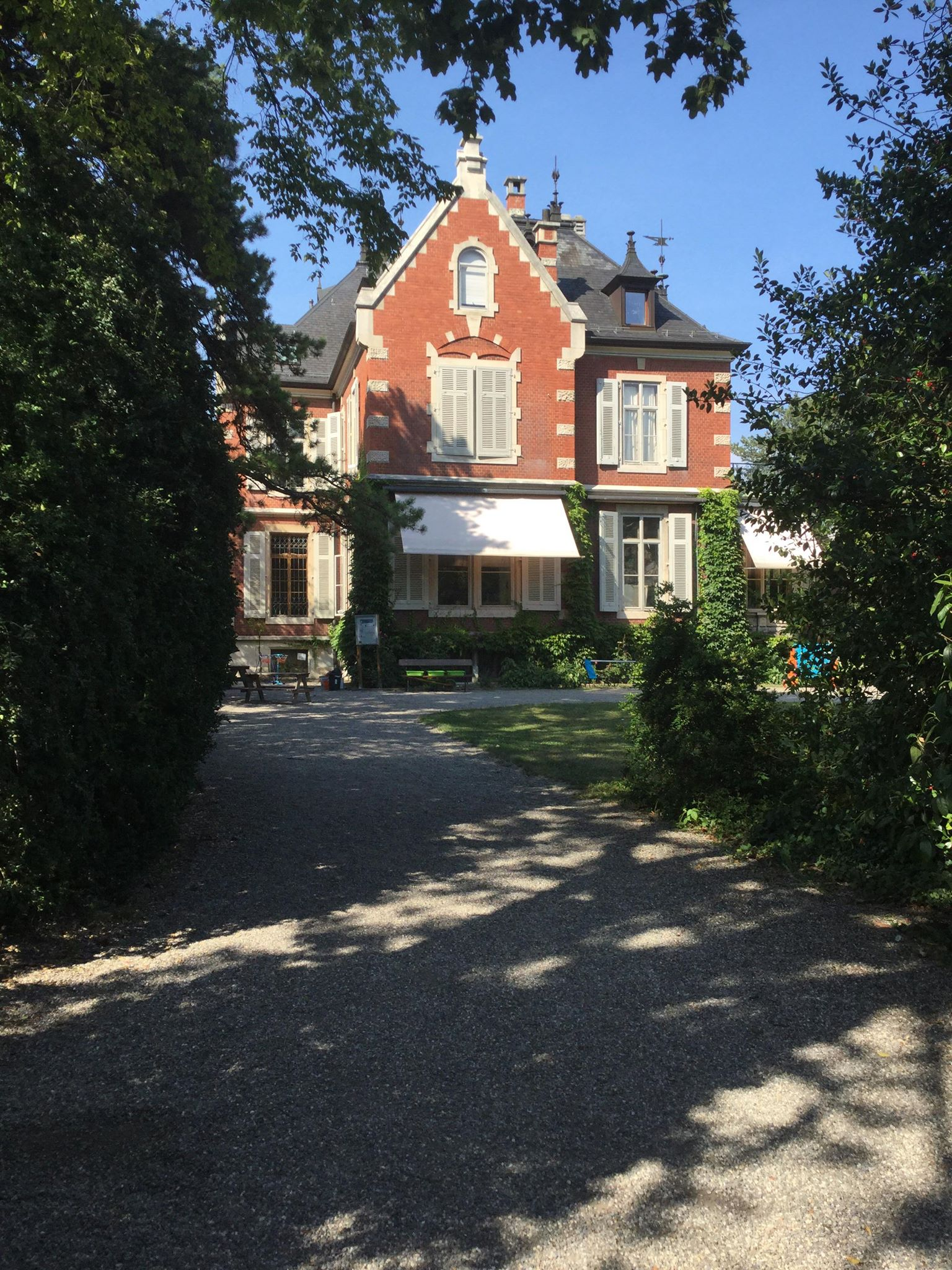
Urban mansion (early 20th century)

== See also ==
- Tourism in Switzerland
- Rhine knee

== Notes ==
Preceded by Vienna, Austria (1965)	World Gymnaestrada host city 1969	Succeeded by Berlin, East Germany (1975)

Preceded by	Eurovision; 2025	Succeeded by
