= Johannes Sichardus =

German jurist and humanist (1499–1552)

Johannes Sichardus (1499 Tauberbischofsheim – 1552 Tübingen, also known as Sichart, Sichard, Sichardt) was a humanist, jurist and law professor at the University of Türbingen. He also edited several editions for printers in Basel.

== Early life and education ==
He was born in Tauberbischofsheim into a humble household. In later years, his father would become an innkeeper. With the support of an influential relative from Aschaffenburg, he attended the Latin school in Erfurt. From 1514, Sichard studied at the University of Ingolstadt and graduated in 1518 with a M.A. After graduation, he became a teacher at the schola poetica in Munich. In 1521 he moved to Freiburg where he lectured at the University of Freiburg with the support Ulrich Zasius, but did not achieve to become employed as a professor. Zasius then recommended him to the University of Basel where he lectured on rhetoric.

== Basel ==
Between 1524 and 1530 he was a professor in the humanist rhetoric and law at the University of Basel. In 1524 he was nominated a professor at the philosophical faculty where he lectured rhetoric and on Cicero and Quintilian. He also lectured on law on the recommendation of Claudius Cantiuncula and Zasius, after Bonifacius Amerbach had declined. Being recommended by Zasius, Sichardus felt obliged to lecture in support of legal humanism. In Basel, he was involved in the authorship of over twenty books. In Basel he worked with the printers Andreas Cratander, Adam Petri, and Henric Petri. Adam Petri who also printed two books he edited. In 1528 the Brevarium Alaricum was printed by Henric Petri, but Sichard thought it was the Codex Theodosianus. In 1530 the religious environment with the reformation let Sichard leave Basel.

=== Freiburg ===
He then went to Freiburg where Sichard studied law with Zasius. In November 1531 he graduated as a doctor in law. Following he lectured on law at the University of Freiburg.

== Tübingen ==
In 1535 he received a call to the University of Tübingen, where he would earn a hundred guilders at the beginning but within two years of teaching, his salary was doubled. He became the rector for the term 1535/1536 and again in 1542, 1545 und 1549. He was the dean seven years. Attempts to recruit him by the city of Nuremberg were unsuccessful but in 1544 the Duke of Wurttemberg Ulrich appointed him the advisor to the duchy for ten years. Emperor Charles V wanted to appoint him as an adviser to the Reichskammergericht in 1548, but he declined.

== Personal life ==
He had a brother, maybe two, and sisters. He died on 9 May 1552. Following his death, Mathias Garbitius held a memorial speech at the University of Tübingen. Sichard raised two nieces but died childless and his wife remarried.
