= Amerbach =

Amerbach may refer to:

- Basilius Amerbach (1533–1591) Swiss lawyer and academic, son of Bonifacius
- Bonifacius Amerbach (1495–1562), Swiss jurist, son of Johann
- Johann Amerbach (c. 1440 – 1513), German-Swiss printer, father of Bonifacius
- Veit Amerbach (1503–1557), German theologian
- Amerbach Cabinet, a collection of works made by the family of Johann Amerbach, including works by Hans Holbein, which formed the basis of the Kunstmuseum Basel
