= Jurist (Switzerland) =

Legal professional in Switzerland

A jurist in Switzerland is a legal professional who has successfully completed university studies in law, culminating in a Master of Law degree (M. Law or MLaw). Unlike the protected professional titles of Lawyer or Notary, jurist is a broader, academic title that indicates qualification but does not, by itself, grant the right to practice in court or perform public authentication.

The title jurist serves as the academic foundation for all roles in the Swiss legal sector. While historically important in the development of the modern federal state, today, jurists form the largest group of legal practitioners. They provide expert legal counsel across diverse fields, commonly serving as specialists in public administration at federal or cantonal levels, working as judges or arbitrators, or acting as in-house counsel for private companies and organizations.

== History ==
=== Medieval period ===
From the 14th century onwards, professional jurists appeared in Switzerland among diplomats, magistrates and politicians, scholars and teachers, civil servants, judges, arbitrators, notaries, clerks and lawyers. In the Middle Ages, the study of law at Bologna, Pavia and other Italian university cities was primarily undertaken by ecclesiastics, who subsequently became canons in cathedral or collegiate chapters. However, representatives of the urban patriciate and merchant class also sought legal education in Italy, where they studied the Corpus Juris Civilis of Justinian, as commented and interpreted by Bolognese jurists (Irnerius, Accursius, Bartolus de Saxoferrato, and Baldus de Ubaldis). This education enabled them to hold public and administrative positions in their homeland, with 220 students from Swiss territories recorded at Bologna before 1330.

Before 1470, more than 1,000 students from Confederate territories matriculated at newly created universities in Vienna, Erfurt, Heidelberg, Leipzig, and Avignon. While knowledge of law was highly valued in ecclesiastical circles and considered essential for service in officialités (church courts also competent for temporal disputes), lay jurists trained in Italy were sometimes viewed with skepticism by the early Confederates. Their specialized knowledge often contradicted Germanic law of popular tradition, which continued to prevail well into the early modern period. However, legal training gained increasing legitimacy in the 15th century for judicial and public functions in urban circles, and the organization and practice of notarial services were subsequently entrusted to professional jurists.

=== Early modern period ===
In the second half of the 15th century, the influence of jurists on the development and application of law increased in the Confederate cantons, as the full reception of Roman law advanced in the Holy Roman Empire and the number of Swiss attending German universities multiplied. Learned law enriched, at least in broad terms, the particular legal conceptions inherited from tradition. However, reservations toward it revived in the mid-16th century, as the Confederation rejected the jurisdiction of the Reichskammergericht (Imperial Chamber Court) and Confederate students turned away from German universities after the Swabian War. Jurists then lost importance and prestige, and only the University of Basel maintained instruction in Roman law during this period (Claudius Cantiuncula, Johannes Sichardus, Bonifacius Amerbach, and Basilius Amerbach the Younger).

The profession regained more numerous training centers and better reputation with the creation of law schools in several Swiss cities from the 17th century onwards. Under the Ancien Régime, in most cantons, high public offices were sometimes entrusted to a jurist, but there were hardly any positions requiring such training. After 1600, professional jurists continued to face resistance, as their argumentation based on Roman law was often perceived as incomprehensible, sometimes perhaps too rigid. In the 17th and 18th centuries, social position determined the selection of magistrates, judges and clerks more than training. Civil and criminal procedures remained in the hands of laypeople, apart from some notable exceptions in the composition of urban courts. In the cantons of Central Switzerland, jurists were occasionally engaged as chancellors.

=== 19th and 20th centuries ===
Swiss universities introduced final examinations in the first half of the 19th century which, combined with the writing of a thesis, conferred the title of doctor. The curriculum leading to a licentiate, initially in effect in the law faculties of French-speaking Switzerland, entered the German-speaking universities in the 20th century. Legal studies became more popular: the University of Zurich awarded 407 doctorates between 1923 and 1932 (including 34 to women), compared to 19 between 1873 and 1882.

From the 19th century onwards, jurists often became lawyers, undertaking to represent before non-professional courts parties not well-versed in legal matters. With the birth of the modern state under the rule of law, they became indispensable pillars of justice and legislation. They increased their presence in the civil service through the creation of numerous administrative positions in the large cantons. From the 19th century onwards, they occupied the majority of positions in urban courts, at least at the higher levels (in contrast, rural courts of first instance are, even today, often composed of laypeople, except for presidents and clerks). In politics, they are proportionally over-represented in legislative and executive authorities, up to the highest levels.

== Education and specialization ==
The curriculum in all Swiss law faculties aims at acquiring a broad base of general knowledge. The scope for specialization during studies is limited. Holders of law degrees subsequently specialize through practical experience and postgraduate education.

Legal studies at Swiss universities have seen substantial growth since 1970. Between 1970 and 2004, the number of law students increased from 3,736 to 12,436, with women's representation rising from 14.6% to 52.1%. During the same period, the proportion of women among doctorate recipients increased from 12.4% (in 1980) to 34.9%, while among licentiate recipients it rose from 25.5% to 52.7%.

== Professional associations ==
The Society of Jurists of Basel, between 1835 and 1845, was the first professional association in the field in Switzerland. The society of the canton of Lucerne, barely founded, succeeded in creating a Swiss Society of Jurists in 1861. The Swiss Society of Jurists (SJG SSJ SGS), which emerged from it, has since organized at each of its annual assemblies a discussion forum on current issues related to the development of law. The society's purpose is to advance legal science in Switzerland and to support the continuing legal education of its members. Numerous advances in the unification of Swiss law (law on debt enforcement and bankruptcy, Civil Code, Criminal Code) are largely due to the initiative of the SJG. Since the 19th century, jurists' associations have also existed in the cantons of Solothurn, Schaffhausen, Bern, Basel-Stadt and Zurich. Like those of other cantons founded in the 20th century, they contribute to the continuing scientific training of their members. In parallel, they also aim to stimulate, in the fields of legislation, doctrine and jurisprudence, an exchange of experiences conducive to the development of cantonal law.

== Professional activities ==
Jurists serve as legal generalists who provide counsel and legal assistance to company management or operational managers in administration. In drafting contracts, developing projects, or in contentious matters, jurists provide legal opinions based on laws, regulations and current jurisprudence.

In private enterprise, jurists direct legal, human resources, marketing or financial departments of banks, insurance companies, fiduciary firms, national or multinational companies. They participate in major commercial, financial and technical decisions made by management, handle contentious affairs, draft and verify the legality of contracts, negotiate with clients, evaluate operational risks, devise the most advantageous legal arrangements for the company, and collaborate in developing corporate strategy in a context of increased competition and internationalization of business.

In public administration, jurists advise department and service heads on all legal problems, collaborate with members of executive bodies (Confederation, cantonal government, municipality), participate in drafting bills and regulations and adapting them after consultation with interested circles, investigate appeals and defend the rights of the State or administration in cases of claims for damages, settle disputes and bear responsibility for legal opinions given.

The public and private sectors offer numerous opportunities for jurists: banks, insurance companies, fiduciary firms, commerce and industry, associations, trade unions, aid organizations, international organizations, diplomatic service, municipal, cantonal or federal departments of justice, finance, health, public works, among others.

== Bibliography ==
- S. Stelling-Michaud, Les Juristes suisses à Bologne 1255-1330, 1960
- H. Fritzsche, La Soc. suisse des juristes 1861-1960, 1961 (German 1961)
- K.H. Burmeister, Das Studium der Rechte im Zeitalter des Humanismus im deutschen Rechtsbereich, 1974
- H. Merz et al., ed., Juristengenerationen und ihr Zeitgeist, 1991
- R. Frank, 100 Jahre Zürcherischer Juristenverein 1893-1993, 1994
- G. Kleinheyer, J. Schröder, ed., Deutsche und Europäische Juristen aus neun Jahrhunderten, 4th ed. 1996
- R.C. Schwinges, ed., Gelehrte im Reich, 1996
