= Johannes Petri =

Johannes Petri may refer to:

- Johannes Petri (printer) (1441–1511), printer in Basel
- Johannes Petreius (1497–1550), printer in Basel

== See also ==
- Schwabe (publisher), founded by Johannes Petri (1441–1511)
