= Studia Philosophica =

Studia Philosophica may refer to:

- Studia Philosophica (Czech Republic)
- Studia Philosophica Estonica
- Studia philosophica Gandensia
- Studia Philosophica (Poland)
- Studia Philosophica (Switzerland)
- Studia Philosophica Wratislaviensia
