= Urs Graf =

Swiss Renaissance painter and printmaker (1485–1528)

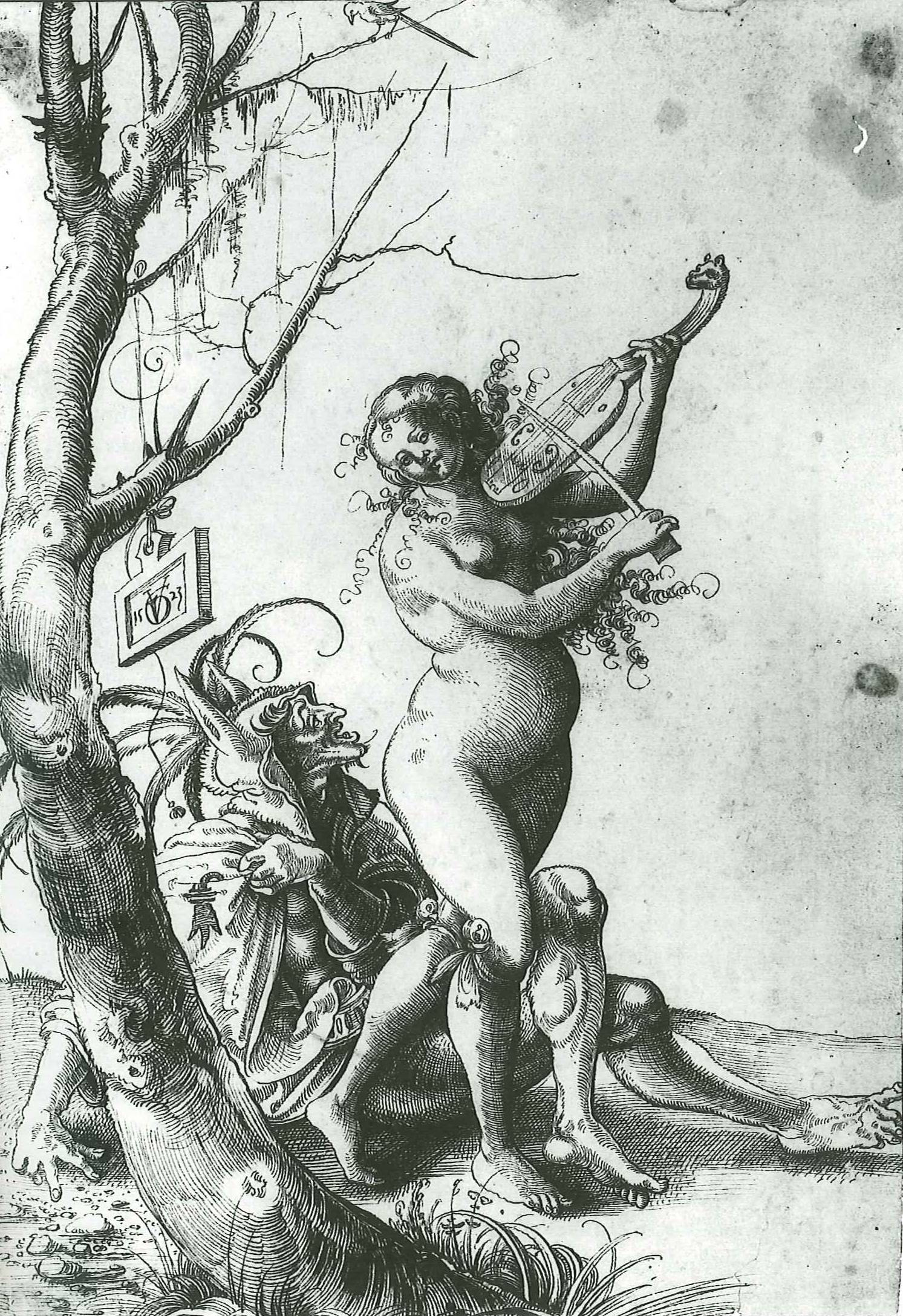
Urs Graf, Naked female fiddler with an old fool from Basel (1523), wood engraving

Urs Graf (c. 1485 in Solothurn, Switzerland – possibly before 13 October 1528) was a Swiss Renaissance goldsmith, painter and printmaker (of woodcuts, etchings and engravings), as well as a Swiss mercenary. He only produced two etchings, one of which dates from 1513 – the earliest known etching for which a date has been established. However, his woodcuts are considered of greater significance, particularly as he is attributed with the invention of the white-line woodcut technique, where white lines create the image on a black background. He also produced a few engravings, including copies of works by Martin Schongauer and Albrecht Dürer. He produced innovative drawings intended as finished works of art rather than just studies.

== Biography ==
Graf learned goldsmithing first from his father, Hugo Graf, then from a goldsmith in Zürich. He continued to work as a goldsmith and a few pieces survive. He initially earned money as a designer of woodcut book illustrations and by assisting the stained glass painter, Lienhart Triblin. In 1511, he designed the book cover for the Decretum Gratiani for the printers Johann Amerbach, Johannes Petri and Johannes Froben and by 1512 Graf designed the cover of book with the sermons of the deceased Johann Geiler von Keysersberg for Adam Petri, the successor and nephew from Johannes Petri. In 1512, he bought citizenship in Basel and became a member of the goldsmiths' guild. He quickly came into conflict with the law for abusing his wife and consorting with prostitutes, culminating in accusations of attempted murder which caused him to flee the city in 1518. He was allowed to return to Basel the following year, where he continued working, but after 1527 his life becomes unclear. Given his frequent employment as a soldier of fortune it is possible he was present at the sack of Rome. Christiane Andersson noted that, "When and where he died are unknown: his wife remarried in October 1528 but an autograph drawing is dated 1529".

Like many Swiss men of his day, Graf was known to have worked as a mercenary for considerable periods. His artistic output, arising from the tradition of Albrecht Dürer and Hans Baldung, includes a wide range of subjects, depicting social, erotic, military, political, and criminal images (e.g., Two Prostitutes Beating a Monk), as well as strong religious feelings which emerge in some works.
