= Portrait of Bonifacius Amerbach =

Portrait of Bonifacius Amerbach by Hans Holbein the Younger

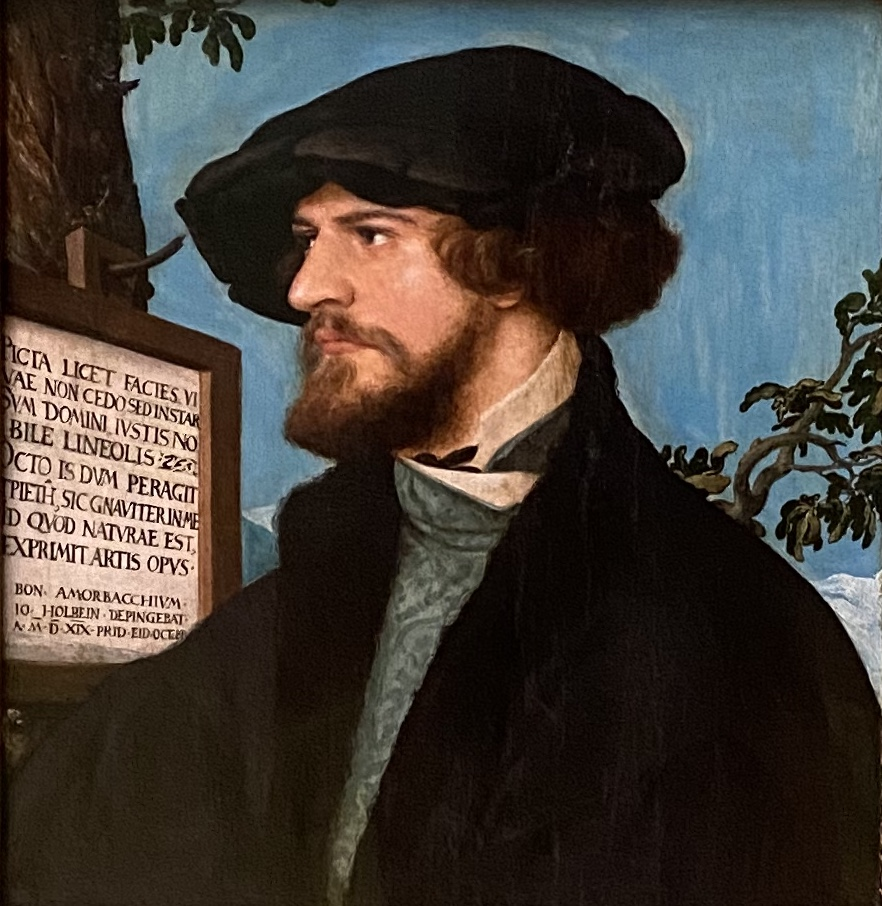
- Artist: Hans Holbein the Younger
- Year: 1519
- Medium: mixed technique on pine panel
- Dimensions: 29.9 cm × 28.3 cm (11.8 in × 11.1 in)
- Location: Kunstmuseum Basel; Basel
- Accession: Inv. 314
- Website: kunstmuseumbasel.ch

The Portrait of Bonifacius Amerbach is a painting by the German master of the Renaissance Hans Holbein the Younger. It is deposited in the Basler Kunstmuseum as part of the Amerbach Cabinet. It is painted in mixed technique on pine panel and measures 29.9 cm x 28.3 cm.

== Description ==
The painting was commissioned in 1519 by Bonifacius Amerbach, in order to leave a memory to his family in case he died during his stay in Avignon. Holbein portrayed him shortly after his return to Basel from Lucerne. Amerbach worked closely with Holbein during work on the portrait and also composed the scripture in Latin letters hanging from a tree in the left of the painting. Several of Amerbach's annotations concerning the text are to be found in the University Library of Basel. He carefully composed the text on the painting, the first words Picta licet are annoted twenty times on a sheet. There was also a version of a six-line verse but eventually he opted for a verse of three phrases. It is assumed he drafted the text in one day, as the ink on the sheet is of the same color. It was the first time Holbein included a panegyric text in a portrait. As with some of the later examples, the text is presented in combination with an image of a fig tree. Modern research with infrared reflectography resulted in the assumption that Bonifacius had encouraged Holbein to adapt the text, as Amerbach had prepared the original script for the painting which included COLORIBVS for colors, but in the painting LINEOLIS for lines is to be seen. Through the analysis with infrared reflectography, the adaptions could be detected. On the right beside Amerbach there is a fig tree, while in the background there are snowy mountains. The 14 October 1519 refers to the birthday of Bonifacius Amerbach. The portrait is one of the earliest paintings by Holbein as a member of the painters guild of Basel. As a member of the guild he was allowed to sign the painting with his full name. A text drafted for a second portrait without a beard was also found, but it is not known whether such a painting was ever realized.

== Provenance ==
The painting became a part of the Amerbach cabinet, which was bought in its entirety by the city of Basel and the University of Basel in 1666. The portrait was later exhibited in two different locations near the Münster of Basel. In 1936 the Kunstmuseum Basel inaugurated a new building at the St. Alban Graben in which the portrait is exhibited.

== See also ==
- List of paintings by Hans Holbein the Younger
