= Bonifacius Amerbach =

Swiss jurist and humanist (1495–1562)

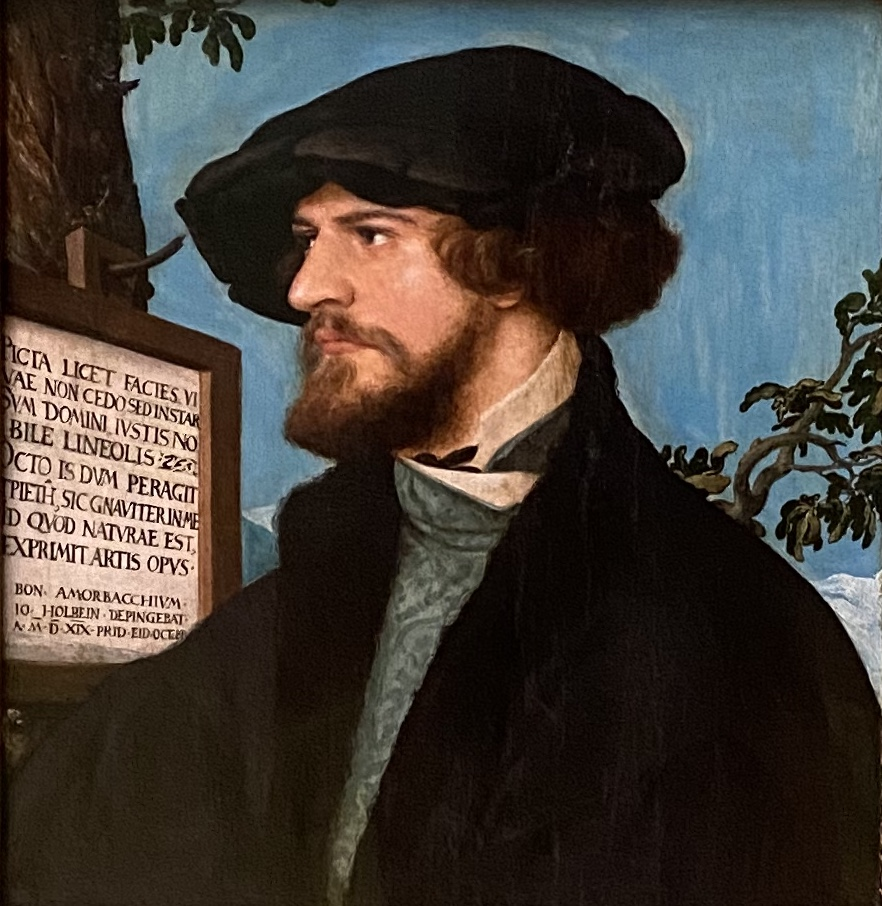
Portrait of Bonifacius Amerbach by Hans Holbein the Younger

Bonifacius Amerbach (1495–April 1562) was a jurist, scholar, an influential humanist and the rector of the University of Basel for several terms.

== Early life and education ==
Born on the 11 October 1495, he was the youngest son of the printer Johannes Amerbach who immigrated to Basel from Amorbach in Bavaria and Barbara Ortenberg. He was baptized in the Theordorchurch and had two godfathers and one godmother. He received his primary education in Basel from where he was sent away from the family in 1502 and 1507 into safety from the plague. On the second occasion he went to the monastery of Engental in Muttenz, where his teacher was Conrad of Leonberg. In 1507, he was sent to the famous Latin school in Schlettstadt, where he was accommodated by its principal Hieronymus Gebwiler. He studied in Schledtstadt until November 1508.

He returned to Basel where he enrolled studied law at the University of Basel, earning a B.A. in 1511 and an M.A. in 1513. From 1510 onwards, he was taught Greek by the Dominican Johannes Cuno, who became the private teacher of Johann Amerbach's sons and also of Beatus Rheanus. Between 1513 and 1519 he studied law with Ulrich Zasius in Freiburg im Breisgau, with whom he established a close relationship. It was also in Freiburg that he developed a friendship with Erasmus of Rotterdam. He followed up on his studies with Andreas Alciatus in Avignon from 1520 onwards.

In 1519, before his departure to Avignon, Amerbach was painted by Hans Holbein the Younger in order to leave his family a memory, should he die on his travels. In Avignon he made the acquaintance of Guillame Budé, whose writings he had studied in Freiburg and who was an influential scholar of and proponent for French legal humanism. When in 1521 the plague reigned in Avignon, he relocated to Basel for a year. In 1522 he returned to Avignon, where he received his doctorate in 1525. His doctoral adviser was Francesco Ripa.

== Academic career ==
As the successor of Claudius Cantiuncula, he taught at the University of Basel from 1525 onwards and was a main force behind the re-opening of the university following the closure during the Reformation in 1529. During the Reformation he abstained to accept the teachings of the reformator of Basel Johannes Oecolampadius and for a while was determined to leave Basel if those views on the Lord's supper would become to official views by the cities Government. Even though Oecolampadius's views came through, he then stayed but the requirements to be assigned as a professor at the University of Basel were adapted and he was excepted from the duty to attend the Lord's supper. He was assigned with teaching Roman Law in 1530 and by 1532 he was the sole Professor teaching at the Faculty of Law in Basel. In 1544, Johann Ulrich Zasius, the son of his former teacher, taught at the faculty of law at the University of Basel. In 1539 he again fled the plague in Basel and stayed for a while with his stepfather in Neuenburg. He was elected the rector of the University of Basel five terms, the first term being in 1526 and established the chair for Aristortelic Ethics. He was a professor for law until his death in 1562.

=== Legal humanist ===
He became a prominent legal humanist of Europe during the 15th century, and has corresponded with a vast number of contemporary humanists. Throughout his career he was a moderate voice between the defenders of the mos italicus and those of the mos gallicus. He was not satisfied with just knowing what a texts content was, but was also interested in what the scholars said about the text.

=== Christian faith ===
Together with the Catholic Erasmus he had a conciliar approach towards the Lutheran and Zwinglian reformists. He was also not an active supporter of the Reformation, which was introduced in Basel in 1529 and as the Bildersturm reached Basel, he was able to save several paintings by Hans Holbein the Younger whose works he had collected for years. As he was opposed to the Reformation, Amerbach left Basel for some months, but eventually returned. It was only in 1534 when he gave in and formally became a Reformist, also partaking in the Lord's Supper. Despite his official adherence to the Reformation, his friendship with Erasmus perdured and in 1535 Amerbach convinced him to return to Basel from Freiburg im Breisgau. He was an expert and delegate at the Christian synod of Strasbourg in 1533 and became the heir of the estate of the Christian scholar and humanist Erasmus of Rotterdam following his death in 1536. As such he also became the caretaker of the Legatum Erasmianum, a foundation set up to support widows, orphans and students.

=== Musical interest ===
He maintained good relations to the composers Hans Kotter and Sixt Dietrich since he had stayed in Freiburg. From both he ordered compositions. The musician and poet Heinrich Loriti was also known to be close to him.

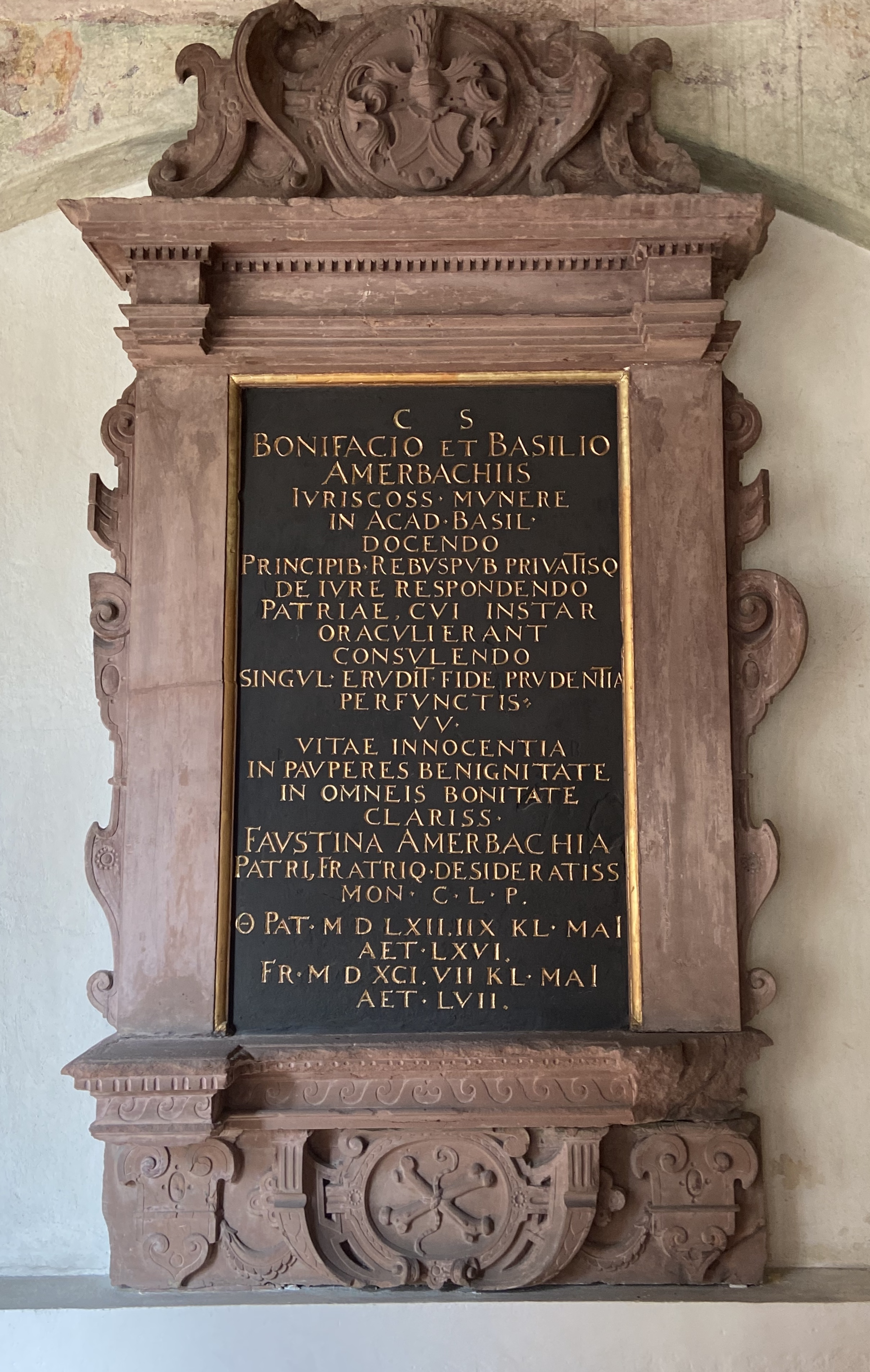
Epitaph for Bonifacius Amerbach and his son Basilius Amerbach

=== Collector ===
Bonifacius Amerbach has assembled a large number of artifacts, coins and medallions during his life. From his father he inherited the vast library upon his death in 1513. He was interested in the goldsmiths designs and works. The collection came into possession of his son Basilius Amerbach and was the foundation of the Amerbach Cabinet.

== Personal life ==
During his studies, he seemed to have had a lover in Avignon, but his sister Margarethe warned him from bringing a French national into the household. After having declined several marriages which his sister and also his teacher Alciatus had offered him, he finally married in 1527. He had a close relationship with various influential personalities at the time such as Paracelsus and Erasmus, who both attended his wedding with Martha Fuchs in Neuenburg am Rhein on 25 February 1527. In 1528, on Christmas Day, a daughter Ursula was born; she died early on the 20th June 1532. His daughter Faustina was born in 1530. Hans Holbein the Younger was also a guest in his house in Basel, and Amerbach was portrayed by him in 1519. Later, his family became the guardian of various paintings of him. In 1533, his son Basilius Amerbach was born. His wife Martha and his youngest daughter Esther died when in 1541/42 the plague was raging in Basel. On the 5th of January 1542, his Esther died.

After Amerbach's father-in-law Leonhard Fuchs died in 1546 in Neuenburg, Bonifacius Amerbach became the head of the entire Amerbach and Fuchs families. He died in April 1562 and was buried at the Monastery St. Margarethental in Basel.
