= Johannes Cuno =

Dominican humanist (1462/1463–1513)

Johannes Cuno (1462/1463 Nuremberg – 1513 Basel) was a Dominican humanist and early greek scholar in the Germanophone region. He was also a translator from the Greek language and collector of manuscripts and books. While living in Basel, he assisted the printer Johann Amerbach and was teacher for the Greek language to Amerbachs sons and Beatus Rhenanus.

== Early life and education ==
He was of a humble background and a member of the Dominican Monastery in Nuremberg. From 1496, Johannes Cuno became a student of Johann Reuchlin, the first greek scholar in the Germany. His aim was to study the greek texts of the early christians. In 1501 he became a teacher in the monastery Liebenau In 1504 he settled to Venice, where he followed up on his studies in Greek. While in Venice, he was employed for some time in the workshop of the printer Aldus Manutius, who was publishing several works from Greek authors. In 1506, he enrolled in the University of Padua, where he attended the lectures of Marcus Masuros.

== Professional career ==
In 1510 he moved to Basel with the approval of the Dominican Master of Order Thomas Cajetan. He stayed at the Dominican Preachers Monastery in Basel and was employed as the translator of Greek manuscripts by the printer Johann Amerbach. He would also assist Amerbach in publishing Erasmus of Rotterdams edition of the Hieronymus and the New Testament. Cuno also become the private teacher for the greek language to Johann Amerbach's sons Bonifacius, Basilius and Bruno. Cuno was also a teacher to Beatus Rhenanus, who would become his favorite alumni. In 1513 Cuno died and left his library to Beathus Rhenanus. Throughout his life he focused on translating the works of the early authors in christianity like Gregory of Nazanius, Chrysostomus or John of Damascus.
