= Notary (Switzerland) =

Legal profession in Switzerland

Occupation
- Names: Notaire (French); Notar (German); Notaio (Italian)
- Occupation type: Profession
- Activity sectors: Law

Description
- Competencies: Legal knowledge, impartiality, confidentiality
- Education required: Master's degree in law, cantonal examination
- Related jobs: Lawyer, Registrar

In Switzerland, a notary is a highly specialized legal professional and public officer authorized to authenticate documents, certify legal transactions, and provide impartial counsel. While all notaries are jurists (those holding a law degree), their specific role is distinct from that of a lawyer, whose primary duty is to represent and advocate for one party's interests. The notary's function, by contrast, is to ensure the legality and formal validity of agreements for all parties involved.

The Swiss notarial system is distinctive because its organization is determined at the cantonal level, leading to three primary models: the Latin Notariat (free, self-employed professionals), the State Notariat (civil servants), and the Mixed/Lawyer-Notary System (where private lawyers may also act as notaries).

Notarial authentication is legally mandatory for essential instruments, including the transfer of real estate, the incorporation of companies, and formal family and inheritance agreements like wills. Becoming a notary typically requires a Master of Law degree followed by a rigorous specialized examination and adherence to strict professional liability standards.

== History ==
=== Middle Ages ===
The notarial profession in Switzerland is linked to the reception of Roman law in the Late Middle Ages. Public notaries, independent of the papal chancellery and seigneurial courts, arrived in western Switzerland during the 13th century from Northern Italy and France via Savoy, Valais, and Geneva.

The profession spread northward, not as free public notaries but as administrative notaries exercised by authorized persons such as city secretaries or Landschreiber (cantonal secretaries). It subsequently expanded eastward to the Grisons. The southern valleys of Grisons (Mesolcina, Poschiavo, and Bregaglia) and Ticino, particularly the Sottoceneri, had known an ancient form of notarial practice from Northern Italy before the year 1000.

In comparison, the arrival of the notariat in western Switzerland was relatively late. Geneva had examples of public notaries, but most were notarii curiae who depended on ecclesiastical courts and served as sworn secretaries of the dioceses of Geneva and Lausanne. To obtain legal force, their instruments were provided with official seals alongside the notarial signet. In the French-speaking part of the Diocese of Lausanne, sworn notaries were found in the deaneries of Avenches, Fribourg, Lausanne, Neuchâtel, Ogoz, and Vevey. Notarial acts were drafted in Latin until the Reformation, except in Neuchâtel, Estavayer-le-Lac, and Fribourg, where French (and German in the city of Fribourg) was introduced before 1500. In the Pays de Vaud and Geneva, the profession was subordinated to secular authorities in 1536, and French became mandatory.

In the Diocese of Sion, the notariat took time to replace the chancelleries of the Augustinian canons of Saint-Maurice and the cathedral chapter of Sion, although it became increasingly present within the chancelleries from the second half of the 13th century. In 1475, the Bishop of Sion Walter Supersaxo took control of this activity. The notarial function appeared in Fribourg only from the mid-14th century onward, with sworn notaries working for the officiality of Lausanne or the deanery of Fribourg, and sworn secretaries of the city itself.

The registers kept by notaries in western Switzerland, particularly in Fribourg, as well as the repertoires and notarial documents of Ticino and southern Grisons, constitute major sources for the economic and social history of the Late Middle Ages.

=== Early modern and modern period ===
While 14th-century public notaries were still appointed by the Pope, Emperor, or King, from the 15th century onward they were designated by territorial lords (nobles, bishops, or city councils, such as in Geneva from 1536). The Reformation drove out apostolic notaries and officalities from regions that embraced it. From 1460 until the end of the Ancien Régime, numerous notaries were appointed in Basel, Chur, and St. Gallen by an imperial dignitary bearing the title of count palatine. Where the right of appointment passed to local authorities, regional rules progressively replaced common law provisions regarding notarial practice.

In the early modern period, free notaries were increasingly subjected to regulations (for example, from 1523 in Bern). Their appointment followed precise protocols and rituals, such as the presentation of a quill, inkwell, ring, or diploma. Appointment was subject to certain conditions: candidates had to take an oath, be of legitimate birth, demonstrate honesty and integrity, possess good handwriting, and have legal knowledge. From the 17th century onward, increasing numbers of Swiss notaries benefited from university training, often acquired abroad. A notarial school existed in Brig before 1550; others were founded in Bern in 1661, then in Lausanne, Geneva, and Fribourg. Examination commissions were established in 1718 in Bern and 1719 in Basel.

The 19th century was characterized by the adoption of cantonal legislation that ended common notarial law. The expansion of commerce and the growing need for transparency in public acts led to further strengthening of regulation. The French notion of public notary (according to the decree of 1791) particularly influenced French-speaking Switzerland and Ticino. Cantonal legislation (Valais and Ticino in 1802, Vaud in 1803, Geneva in 1804, and Fribourg in 1805) initially tended to liberalize the profession, from which women were largely excluded until the 20th century. The entry into force in 1907 of the Swiss Civil Code necessitated adaptation of cantonal legislation regarding authentic acts, particularly concerning minimum requirements for their content and procedure.

== Organization ==
=== Cantonal systems ===
Different forms of notarial systems in Switzerland: Liberal notariat State notariat Mixed form

The organization of notaries in Switzerland is highly decentralized with cantonal autonomy (Art. 55 of the Civil Code). Swiss law grants the 26 cantons the power to regulate all aspects of the notariat, leading to significant variations in the services offered and the type of notary system employed across the country.

Three main systems exist:

- Liberal (or latin) notariat: notaries exercise their function at their own account and risk under state supervision. This system is found throughout Romandy (Fribourg, Geneva, Jura, Neuchâtel, Valais, and Vaud), as well as in Aargau, Basel-Landschaft, Basel-Stadt, Bern, Ticino, and Uri.
- Administrative (or state) notariat: Organized purely by the state, where notaries are part of the administration and employed by the state. This form is practiced in the cantons of Zürich and Schaffhausen.
- Mixed forms: combination of both systems. notarial competence is generally distributed according to domains, without competition. It is found in Eastern Switzerland and in Solothurn.

=== Professional federation ===
The Swiss Notaries Federation (Fédération Suisse des Notaires, FSN) is the umbrella organization of cantonal professional federations. The Institute for Notarial Law and Notarial Practice at the University of Bern, founded in 2003, is dedicated to the study of notarial law.

== Bibliography ==
Middle Ages

- Elsener, Ferdinand: Notare und Stadtschreiber. Zur Geschichte des schweizerischen Notariats, 1962 (Arbeitsgemeinschaft für Forschung des Landes Nordrhein-Westfalen, 100).
- Bautier, Robert-Henri; Sornay, Janine: Les sources de l'histoire économique et sociale du Moyen Age. Provence, Comtat Venaissin, Dauphiné, Etats de la Maison de Savoie, vol. 2, 1971, pp. 1353-1372.
- Rück, Peter: "Die Anfänge des öffentlichen Notariats in der Schweiz (12.-14. Jahrhundert)", in: Archiv für Diplomatik, 36, 1990, pp. 93-123.
- Mango-Tomei, Elsa (éd.): Formulari notarili, vol. 1, 1991 (Les sources du droit suisse, TI C/1).
- Gawlik, Alfred; Schuler, Peter-Johannes et al.: "Notar, Notariat", in: Lexikon des Mittelalters, vol. 6, 1993, colonnes 1271-1279.
- Hildbrand, Thomas: Herrschaft, Schrift und Gedächtnis. Das Kloster Allerheiligen und sein Umgang mit Wissen in Wirtschaft, Recht und Archiv (11.-16. Jahrhundert), 1996, pp. 211-229.
- Roth-Lochner, Barbara: De la banche à l'étude. Une histoire institutionnelle, professionnelle et sociale du notariat genevois sous l'Ancien Régime, 1997 (Mémoires et documents publiés par la Société d'histoire et d'archéologie de Genève, 58).
- Poudret, Jean-François: Coutumes et coutumiers. Histoire comparative des droits des pays romands du XIIIe à la fin du XVIe siècle, vol. 1, 1998, pp. 205-259.

Early modern and modern period

- His, Eduard: "Zur Geschichte des Basler Notariats", in: Basler Zeitschrift für Geschichte und Altertumskunde, 20, 1922, pp. 1-58.
- Rennefahrt, Hermann: Aus der Geschichte des bernischen Notariats, 1946.
- Schmidt, Maurice: La réformation des notaires dans le Pays de Vaud (1718-1723), 1957 (Bibliothèque historique vaudoise, 19).
- Carlen, Louis: Notariatsrecht der Schweiz, 1976.
