= Schwabe (publisher) =

Swiss printer and publisher

Schwabe Verlag
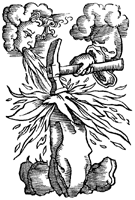
- Founded: 1488
- Founder: Johannes Petri
- Country of origin: Switzerland
- Headquarters location: Basel
- Publication types: Books and Magazines
- Nonfiction topics: Humanities
- Official website: www.schwabe.ch

Schwabe Verlag in Basel is the oldest printing and publishing house in the world. The company is based on the Offizin founded by Johannes Petri after 1488 and has since been an independent Swiss family business.

Schwabe publishes about 120 books and magazines annually, focusing on humanities. Academic proofreading and cooperation with university institutions and academies ensure the scientific quality of individual titles, large projects (e.g. the Historical Lexicon of Switzerland, the Historical Dictionary of Philosophy, the History of Philosophy, the Augustine Encyclopaedia) and more than 20 ongoing series. The company also employs around 160 people working in

- Schweizerischer Ärzteverlag (EMH)
- Johannes Petri, founded in 2010
- printing shop in Muttenz
- computer science and bookshop "Das Narrenschiff."

== History ==
In November 1488, Johannes Petri von Langendorf near Hammelburg in Franconia, who had learned the art of printing and typesetting in Mainz while Johannes Gutenberg was still alive, bought Basel citizenship and the guild rights of the saffron guild. As a result, he published partly independently, but mostly in a printing and publishing community with Johannes Amerbach and Johannes Froben. After his death, his nephew Adam Petri took over the business and reprinted almost all of Martin Luther's important writings. Adam's son Heinrich Petri printed literature from theology to classical authors and contemporary history to mathematics and natural sciences, medicine and alchemy, including numerous collective works and encyclopaedias. In 1556, he was knighted by Emperor Charles V. From then on his descendants called themselves Henricpetri.

== See also ==
- List of oldest companies
