= Conrad of Leonberg =

German monk and humanist scholar (1460–1511)

- Leontorius
- Born: Konrad Töritz c.1460 Leonberg, Swabia, Kingdom of Germany
- Died: 7 January 1511 (aged 50–51); Muttenz, Switzerland
- Occupations: Scholar, monk
- Employer: Cistercian monastery
- Years active: 1490-1511
- Title: General Secretary

Academic work
- Discipline: Linguistics
- Sub-discipline: Latin and Greek

Conrad of Leonberg, or Leontorius, or his real name, Konrad Töritz, (1460–1511) was a German Cistercian monk and Humanist scholar.

== Biography ==
Conrad was born at Leonberg in Swabia in 1460. He took vows at the Cistercian monastery of Maulbronn in the Neckar district, which, unlike most other Cistercian monasteries of those times, was then enjoying its golden age. In 1490 he became secretary-general of his order.

For a time Conrad was engaged in the printing-office of Johann Amerbach at Basel. He was close to Amberbach and supported the use of the Latin script instead of the gothic in his sons handwriting.

When the German Humanists began to revive the study of the Latin and Greek classics, as Conrad deplored the barbarous Latin in which the scholastic philosophers and theologians of Germany were expounding the doctrine of their great masters, he was in full accord with their endeavours to restore the classical Latinity of the Ciceronian Age. He also encouraged the study of Greek.

Conrad kept up correspondences with many of the scholars and writers of his day, both religious and secular. His friend and teacher Reuchlin, a Hebrew scholar, convinced Conrad of the importance of Hebrew for a thorough understanding of the Bible. Conrad consequently became one of the great Hebrew scholars of his time.

He introduced the young Bonifacius Amerbach to Latin poetry in May 1507 in Engental. In 1506 he edited the second edition of the collected works from Ambrose for the printer Johannes Petri. It was one of the early books to have an index.

He died at the abbey Engenthal in Muttenz near Basel around 7 January 1511.

== Works ==
Besides writing numerous Latin poems, orations and epistles, he published (Basel, 1506–1508) the Latin Bible with the "Postilla" and "Moralitates" of the Oxford Franciscan Nicolas de Lyra, together with the "Additiones" of Paul of Burgos (d. 1435) and the "Replicæ" of Mathias Thoring (d. 1469).
