= Studia Philosophica (Switzerland) =

- Discipline: Philosophy
- Language: German, English, French, Italian
- Edited by: Anton Hügli

Publication details
- History: 1941–present
- Publisher: Schwabe (Switzerland)
- Frequency: Annually

Standard abbreviations
- ISO 4: Stud. Philos.

Indexing
- ISSN: 0081-6825

Links
- Journal homepage

Studia philosophica is an annual peer-reviewed academic journal on philosophy. The journal was established in 1941. It is the printed organ of the Swiss Philosophical Society (SPS). Issues appear in 4 different languages (German, French, English, and Italian).

== See also ==
- List of philosophy journals
