= Jurist =

Person with expert knowledge of law

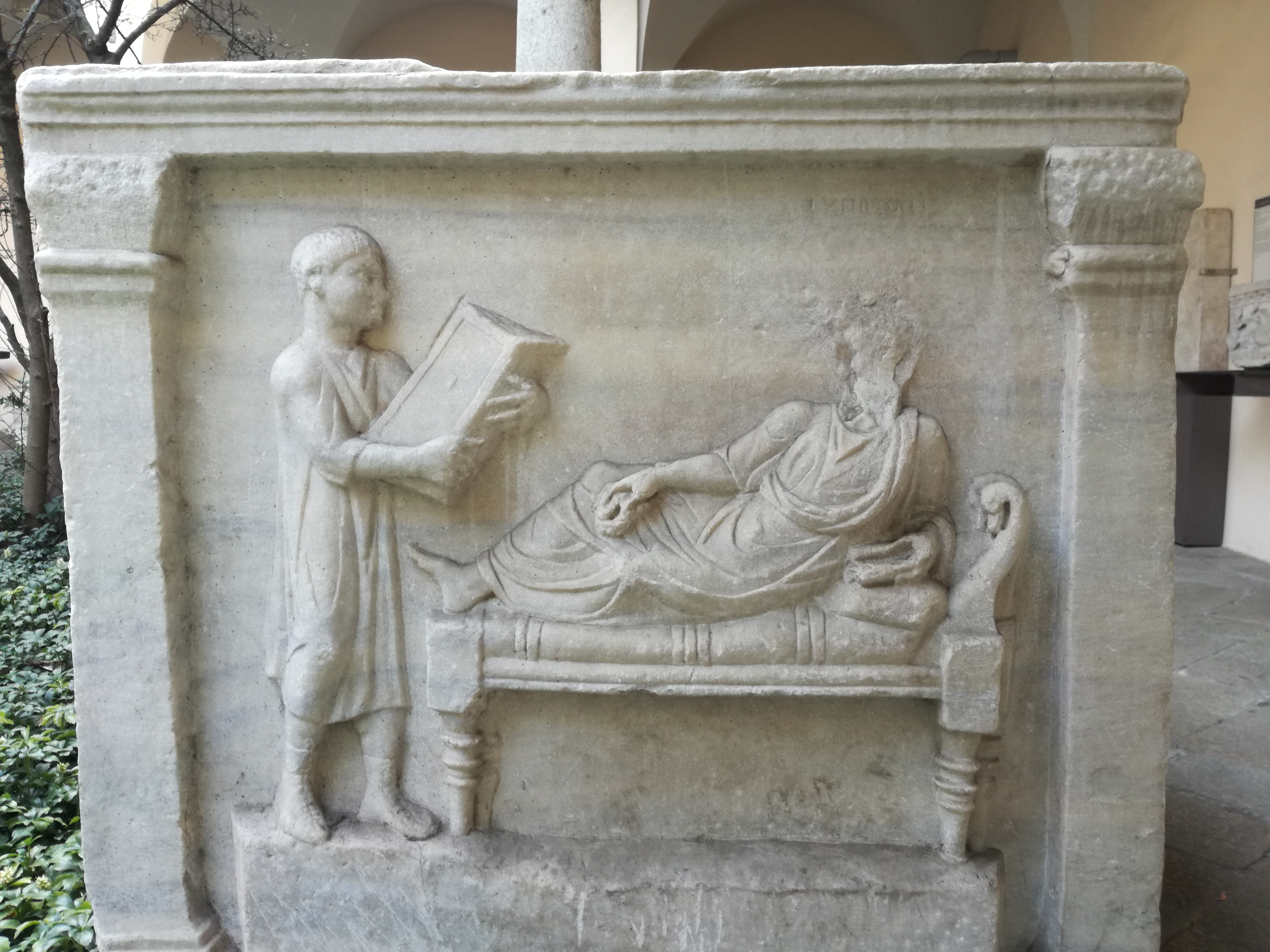
Detail from the sarcophagus of Roman jurist Valerius Petronianus (315–320)

A jurist is a person with expert knowledge of law. Depending on jurisdiction, the term "jurist" can refer to a legal scholar, a judge, or a lawyer.

== By jurisdiction ==
=== Common law ===
In the United Kingdom, the term is sometimes used to describe legal scholars.

In the United States, the term often refers to a judge.

=== Civil law ===
In Roman law, the term jurisconsult (iurisconsultus, sometimes also translated to simply "jurist" in English) referred to a kind of legal professional in Ancient Rome. Presently, a number of civil law jurisdictions retain the term "jurist" (or its equivalent in the native language) to refer to a person with legal training or practice experience.

In Norway, the term is a protected title and refers to lawyers, judges, and academics who have a qualifying law degree.

In Switzerland, the term "juristes" is not a protected title referring to a professional lawyer but refers more broadly to persons who have a degree in law.

== Notable jurists ==
Some notable historical jurists include:

- Ur-Nammu
- Lycurgus of Sparta
- Solon
- Dr. B. R. Ambedkar
- Ulpian and Gaius
- Muhammad Averroes
- Thomas Aquinas
- Hugo Grotius
- Alberico Gentili
- Francis Bacon
- William Blackstone
- Cesare Beccaria
- Jeremy Bentham
- Amina, bint al-Hajj ʿAbd al-Latif
- John Stuart Mill
- John Marshall
- Felix Frankfurter
- Oliver Wendell Holmes Jr.
- Hans Kelsen
- Pontes de Miranda

== See also ==
- History of the legal profession
- Faqīh
- Jurisprudence
- Legal profession
- List of jurists
- Paralegal
