= Hieronymus Schreiber =

German doctor, mathematician and astronomer

Hieronymus Schreiber (died 1547), also called Jerôme Schreiber, was a German doctor, mathematician and astronomer from Nuremberg.

== Biography ==
Schreiber studied from 1532 on at the University of Wittenberg with Philipp Melanchthon. There, he was considered a candidate for the succession to Georg Joachim Rheticus, but Erasmus Flock (1514–1568), another scholar from Nuremberg, was appointed Professor.

In 1543 Schreiber travelled to Italy with Valerius Cordus, then went to study in Paris, where he died in 1547. Few of his works are preserved. In an almanac by Johann Stöffler (1452–1543) and Jacob Pflaum, he had noted weather observations made in Saxony.

Another book annotated by Schreiber, a copy of the original 1543 edition of De Revolutionibus Orbium Coelestium by Nicolaus Copernicus, helped to solve a riddle: that of the book's preface, which contradicted its contents. Rheticus had begun to publish it in Nuremberg, but the process was completed by Andreas Osiander. The printer Johannes Petreius had sent a copy to Schreiber, and after he died, it came into the possession of Johannes Kepler (1571–1630). In Schreiber's book, Kepler found a note attributing the authorship of the anonymous preface to Osiander. Osiander had adjusted the preface written by the Catholic Church canon Copernicus enough to be acceptable at Protestant Nuremberg, as well as having kept it off the Papal forbidden list (until 1620).

== Literature ==
- Kurt Pilz: 600 Jahre Astronomie in Nürnberg. Nürnberg: Hans Carl 1977, S. 216
- Georg Andreas Will: Nürnbergisches Gelehrtenlexikon Bd. 3. Nürnberg: Lorenz Schüpfel 1757, S. 576
