= Peter Schott =

Peter Schott the elder (1427 – 8 August 1504) was a major fifteenth century Strasbourg statesman.

He was a descendant of Claus Schott, from Eysenrodt near Dillenburg, who owned several iron mines, and fathered 14 sons and four daughters.

Peter Schott arrived in Strasbourg in 1449. He acquired citizenship through marriage, entered the Strasbourg government in 1465 and went on to become one of Strasbourg's greatest statesmen. He was four times "ammeister," or chief magistrate, in 1470, 1476, 1482 and 1488, and commanded the armed forces of the Republic in the war against Charles the Bold. He was also known for being a lover of letters and the arts. He regular invited men of learning to his house and made a gift to the cathedral library.

His brother, Friedrich, a sculptor also active in Strasbourg, was father of the printer Martin Schott.

It was Schott who persuaded the young Johann Geiler von Kaisersberg not to pursue a hermit's life and to accept a preaching post in Strasbourg.

He took part in the trail and execution of the Burgundian governor Peter von Hagenbach.

In 1482 he presided over the end of Strasbourg's guild revolts and the last revision of the city's constitution before 1989. The Schworbrief or civic oath of 1482 was a reminder of various recognized procedures, to which all municipal officers swore obedience every year until the French Revolution in 1989.

He married Susanna of Collen (or Colle). They had five children, including Peter (born 9 July 1458, died 1490) who became a great lawyer, theologian and humanist in Strasbourg, and Merga (Maria) (ca.1450-1524).
