= Beatus Rhenanus =

German humanist and book collector (1485–1547)

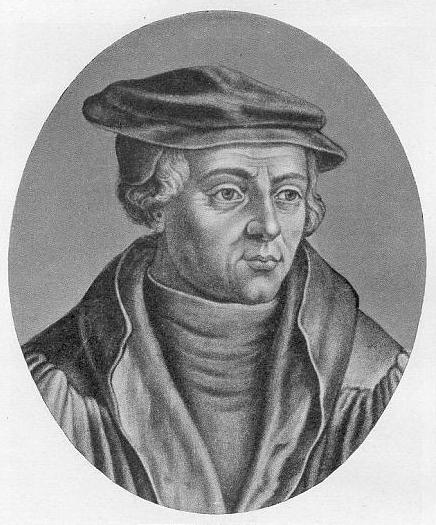
Beatus Rhenanus

Beatus Rhenanus (22 August 1485 – 20 July 1547), born as Beatus Bild, was an Alsatian humanist, religious reformer, classical scholar, and book collector.

== Early life and education ==
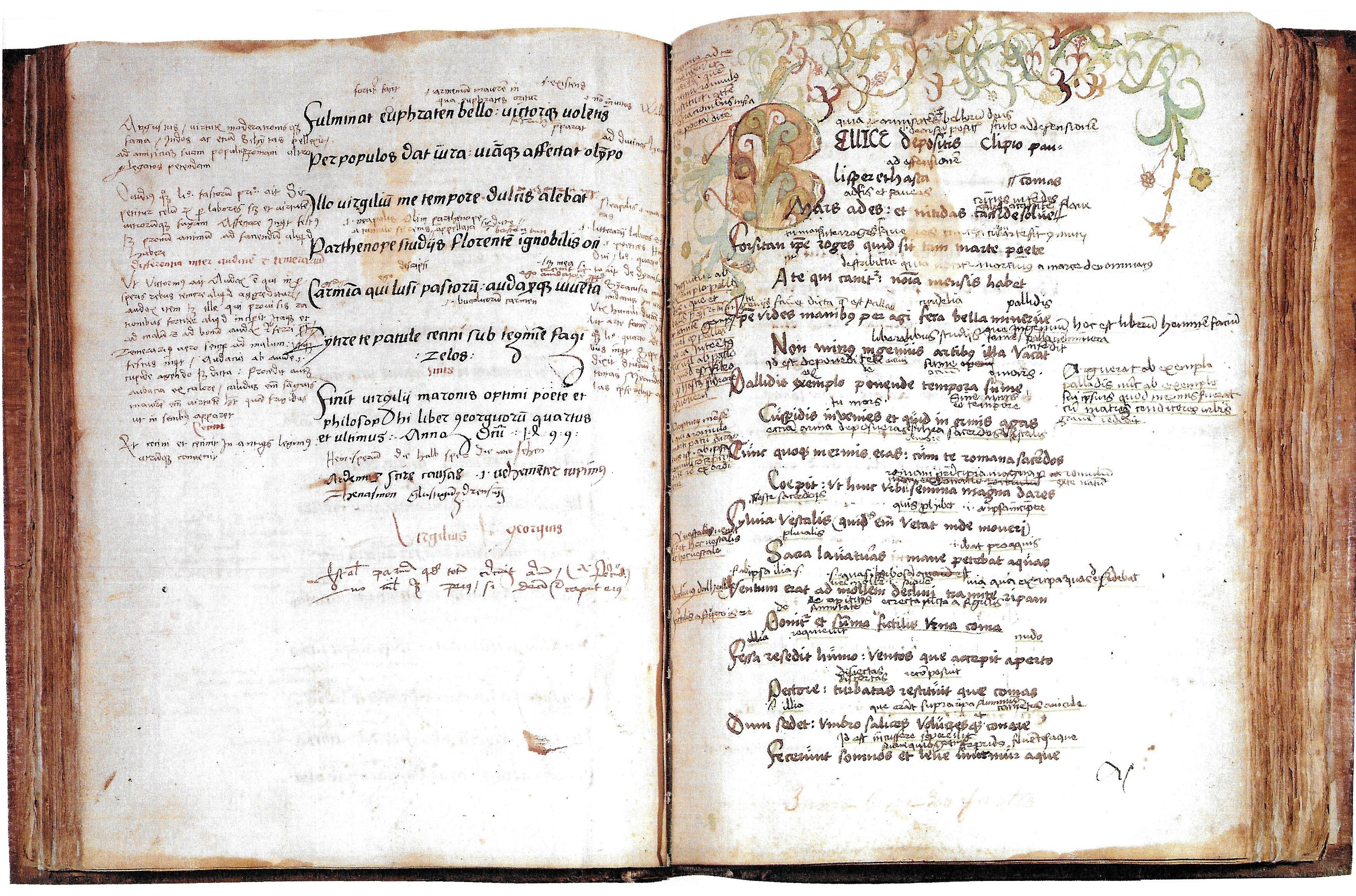
School workbook of Beatus Rhenanus

Rhenanus was born on 22 August 1485 in Schlettstadt (Sélestat) in Alsace. He was the third of three brothers. His father, Anton Bild, was a butcher from Rhinau (the source of his name "Rhenanus", which Beatus Latinised from his father, who was known as the "Rhinauer", the "man from Rheinau"). His grandfather Eberhard emigrated to Schlettstadt from Rheinau, and his son Anton was a member of the local council and acted as Schlettstadt's Mayor between 1495 and 1512. Beatus lost his mother, Barbara Kegler, at the age of three and was raised by his father and his uncle Reinhart Kegler, a priest. His father would not remarry, and focused on providing his only surviving son with an excellent education. Between 1491 and 1503 Rhenanus attended the Latin school of Schlettstadt. His classmates in Schlettstadt were the sons of Johann Amerbach, Basilius and Bruno.

== Paris ==
On 25 April 1503, Rhenanus left Schlettstadt for Paris where he arrived on 9 May 1503. In Paris he entered the College du Cardinal Lemoine, where he came under the influence of Jacobus Lefèvre Stapulensis, an eminent Aristotelian. He assisted Lefèvre in publishing a commented Politika and a treatise on the Nicomachean Ethics by Aristotle in the print of Henri Estienne. After having graduated he returned to Schlettstadt in 1507.

== Strasbourg ==
In the same year he moved to Strassburg (Strasbourg), where he worked for the printer Mathias Schürer and made the acquaintance of prominent Alsatian humanists, including Jakob Wimpfeling, Johann Geiler von Kaisersberg and Sebastian Brant. The works he was involved with at Schürer were poems and treatises by contemporary Italian humanists and are seen as a preparation for his later work on texts by Aristotle and the Fathers of the Church. One was a book by Fausto Anderlini, who was a teacher of his in Paris.

== Basel ==
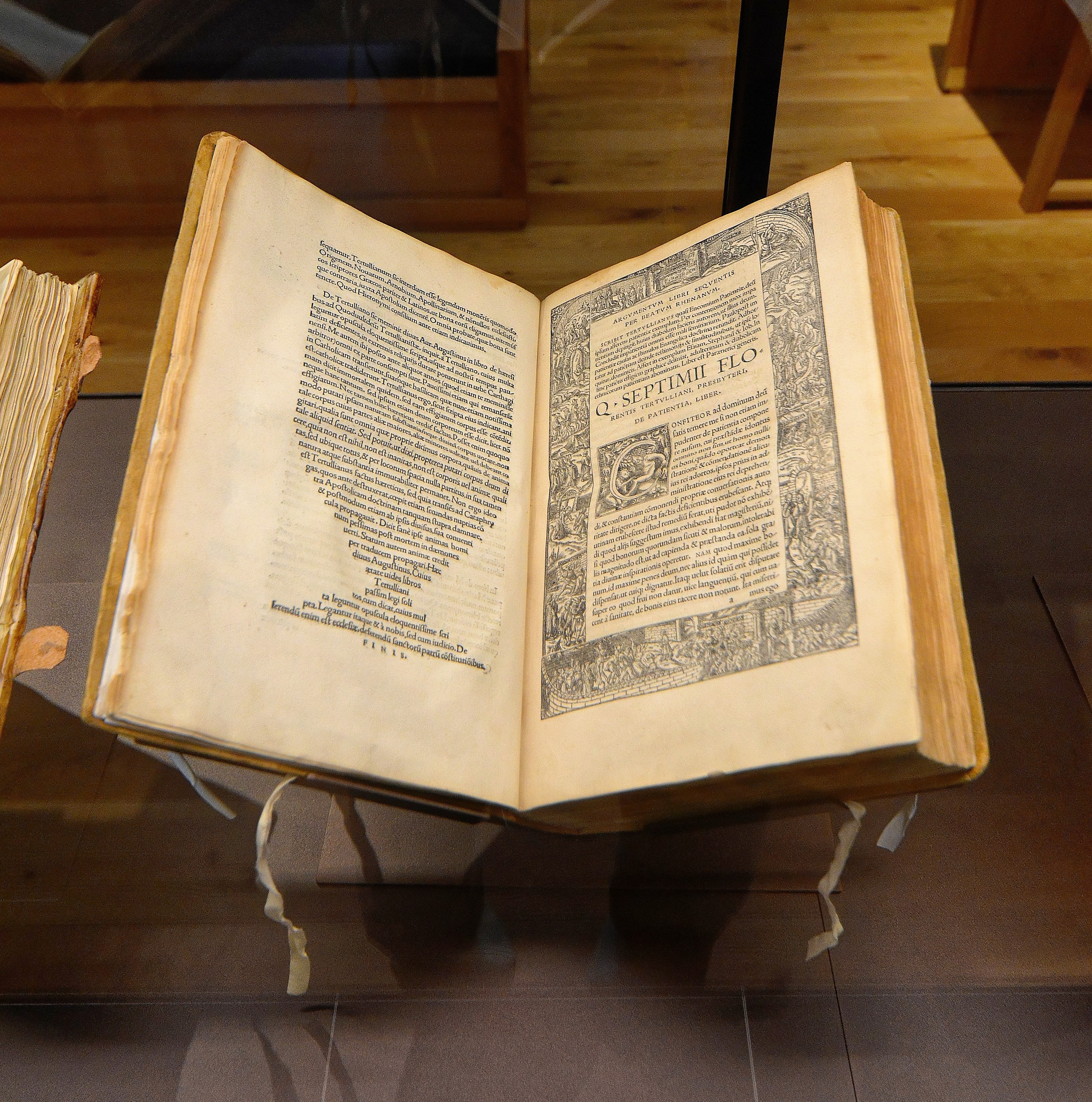
Sélestat (Bas-Rhin), at the Bibliothèque Humaniste. From the personal library of Beatus Rhenanus, Rhenanus' edition of Tertullian

After having also evaluated Orleans for his further studies, he eventually chose to come to Basel in July 1511. He sought to become a student of the teacher of the Greek language Johannes Cuno. Rhenanus would become the favourite student of Cuno, who would later bequeath his library to him.

The 1512 edition of the Decretum Gratiani from the printers Johann Amerbach, Johan Petri and Johann Froben is the first known book he edited in Basel. In Basel he also befriended Desiderius Erasmus and played an active role in the publishing enterprises of Johann Froben. Many of the authors he worked on were historians. While he was staying in Basel, he usually lived several months a year in Schlettstadt. In 1519/1520, when the plague raged in Basel, he stayed in Schlettstadt for over twelve months.

In 1521, his editio princeps first edition of Tertullian was published.

== Schlettstadt ==
Beatus Rhenanus returned to Schlettstadt in 1528 to devote himself to a life of learned leisure. In the early 1530s he edited works of the Roman historians Tacitus and Livy. The Tacitus was published in 1533 by Froben in Basel. He continued a lively correspondence with many contemporary scholars, including his friend Erasmus, and supervised the printing of many of Erasmus's most important works.

== Death and legacy ==
He fell ill around Pentecost 1547 following which he travelled to Wildbad to cure himself. The stay was not successful and, still gravely sick, he eventually arrived in Strasbourg on 14 July. He eventually arrived at the Abbey of Ebersmunster, where he died on 20 July.

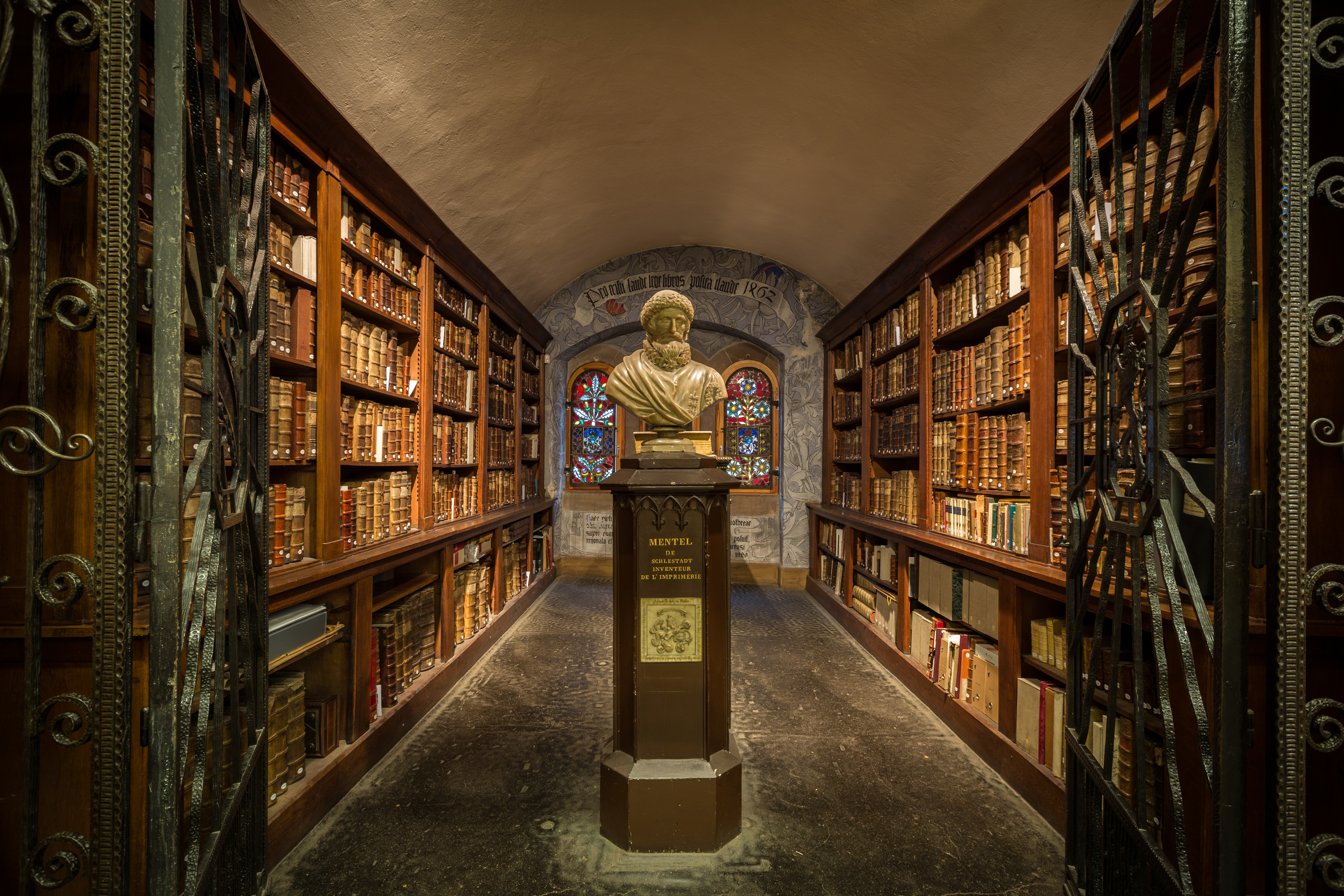
The library of Beatus Rhenanus as preserved in Sélestat in eastern France

Rhenanus's own publications include a biography of Johann Geiler von Kaisersberg (1510), the Rerum Germanicarum Libri III (1531), and editions of Velleius Paterculus (Froben, Basel, 1520), based on the sole surviving manuscript, which he discovered in the Benedictine monastery at Murbach, Alsace. He also wrote works on Tacitus (1519), Livy (1522), and a nine-volume work on his friend Erasmus (1540–1541).

Beatus Rhenanus's collection of books went into the ownership of his hometown on his death, and can still to be seen in its entirety in the Humanist Library of Sélestat. Four years after his death, Johannes Sturm wrote a biography of him.

== Personal life ==
His father Anton Rhinau (Bild) was a member of the council in Schlettstadt from 1479, and he became its mayor in 1497. He had two elder brothers, both of whom died during childhood. His mother died when he was three years of age on 21 July 1487. He died on the way back from Wildbad in Strasbourg on 20 July 1547 while still in hope of a treatment for his sickness.
