= Adam Petri =

Swiss publisher and printer

Adam Petri (1454 in Langendorf (now part of Elfershausen) in Franconia – 15 November 1527 in Basel) was a printer, publisher and bookseller.

== Early life ==
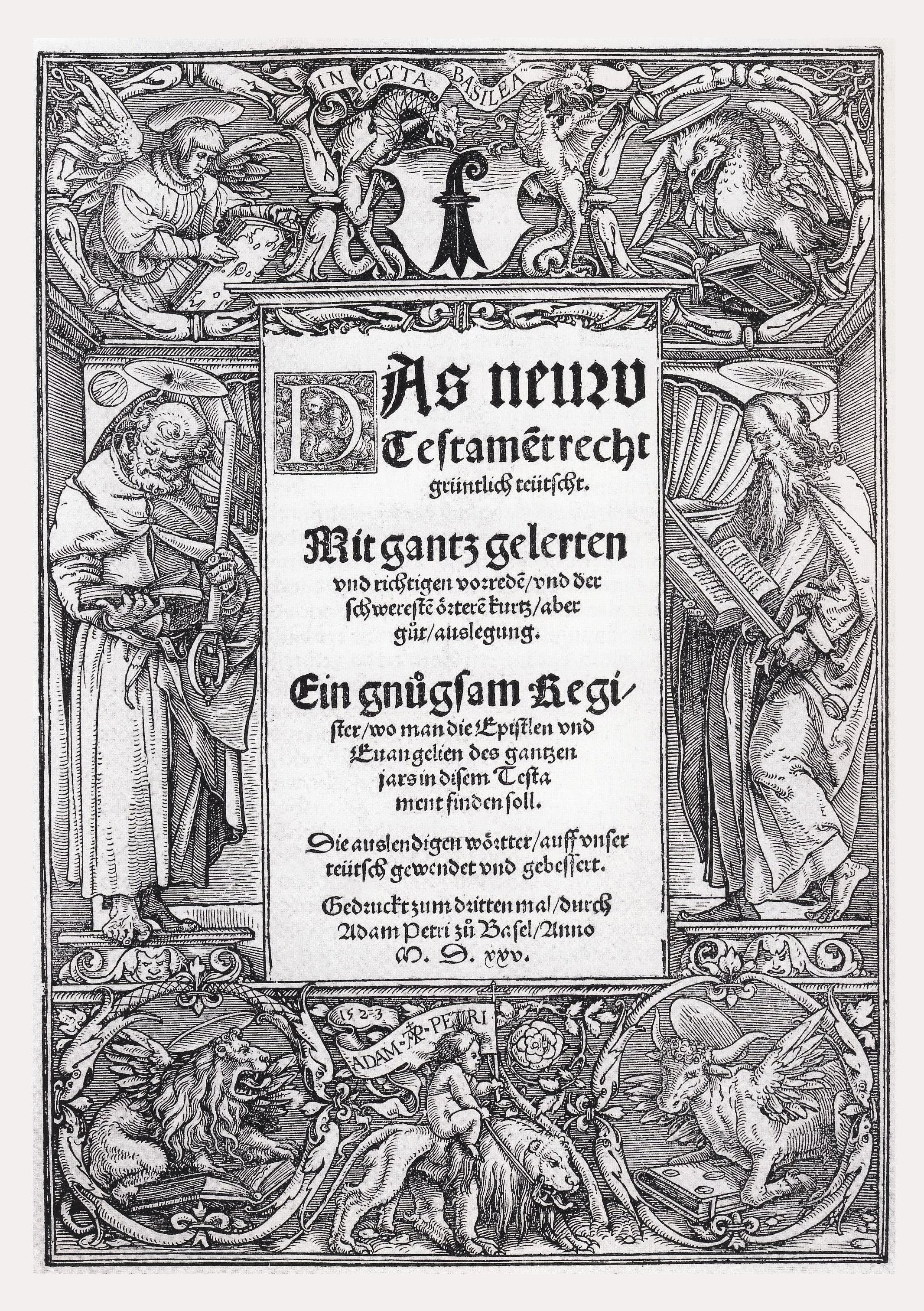
Titlepage of Luther's Das new Testament, printed by Petri in 1525

Petri was born ca. 1454 in Langendorf near Hammelburg. Like his uncle Johannes Petri, he moved to Basel, where he resided from around 1480 and worked as a printer. In 1507 he received Basel citizenship rights. Shortly before his uncle Johannes died, he took over the printshop in the Ackermannshof at the St. Johannsvorstadt.

== Professional career ==
Petri was one of the first printers in Basel who worked with illustrators. His books were illustrated by the likes of Urs Graf, Hans Holbein the Younger, and Conrad Schnitt, among others. He also employed a number of prominent collaborators as writers, editors and proofreaders, including Konrad Pellikan, the young Sebastian Münster, Beatus Rhenanus, Ulrich Hugwald and his relative Johannes Petreius.

Petri chiefly printed devotional literature and works of practical theology. After 1517 his printshop was primarily occupied with the publication of texts of the Protestant Reformation. Of the more than 300 publications from the Offizin Adae Petri, there are more than 88 editions of Martin Luther. He also published works of other German reformers like Johannes Bugenhagen, Hartmuth by Cronberg, Philipp Melanchthon, Andreas Karlstadt and a few titles by the Swiss Reformers Huldrych Zwingli, Joachim Vadian and Johannes Oecolampadius.

Of Bugenhagen, he printed his "Interpretations of the Psalms" (Lat.Librum Psalmorum interpretatio) in the Latin language in 1524 and two years later also the German translation, for which the Psalms text and the translation by Martin Luther were used. The Latin version had a book cover with a drawing by Hans Holbein the Younger. The German translation counted with forewords by Martin Luther and Martin Bucer.

His edition of Jan Hus, which appeared under the title Liber egregius de unitate ecclesiae, cuius author periit in concilio Constantiensi in 1520, attracted a great deal of attention. Petri was also able to produce a reprint of Luther’s translation of the Bible with amazing speed. Only a quarter of a year after the edition of the “September Testament”, Petri's edition appeared in December 1522 under the title Das new Testament yetzund recht grüntlich teutscht.. Between 1523 and 1524, Petri printed Luther’s translation of the Old Testament under the title Der ursprunglichen Hebreischen warheit nach auffs trewlichst verdeutscht. Petri died on 15 November 1527.

== Personal life ==
In 1507, he married Anna Selber, a member of a Basel burgher family. A year later, their son Heinrich Petri was born. His widow Anna remarried the cartographer, cosmographer, and a Hebrew scholar Sebastian Münster in 1530. His son Heinrich Petri successfully continued the family’s printing house.
