= Johann Geiler von Kaysersberg =

Swiss priest (1445–1510)

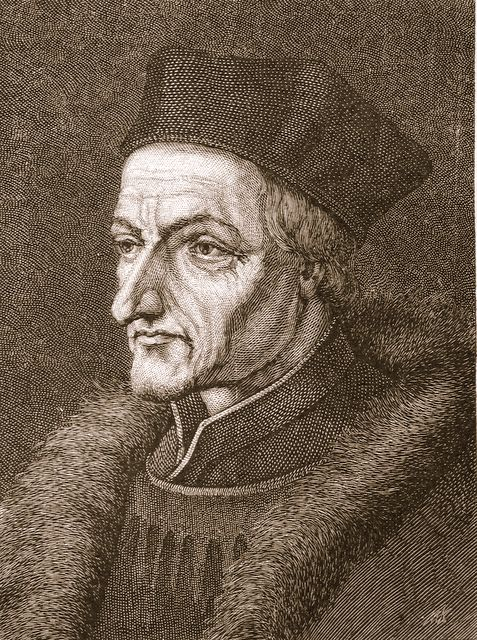
Johann Geiler

Johann Geiler von Kaysersberg (16 March 1445 – 10 March 1510) was an Alsatian priest, considered one of the greatest of the popular preachers of the 15th century. He was closely connected with the Renaissance humanists of Strasbourg, whose leader was the well-known Jakob Wimpfeling (1450–1528), called "the educator of Germany". Like Wimpfeling, Geiler was a secular priest; both fought the ecclesiastical abuses of the age, but not in the spirit of Martin Luther and his adherents. They looked, instead, for salvation and preservation only in the restoration of Christian morals in Church and State through the faithful maintenance of the doctrines of the Church. However the moral reforms of Johann Geiler laid the groundwork for the Protestant reformation in Strasbourg.

== Early life and education ==
He was born at Schaffhausen, but from 1448 passed his childhood and youth at Kaysersberg in Upper Alsace. His grandfather, who brought him up, lived there. The father was killed by a hunting-accident when Geiler was three years old; and his grandfather took charge of the education of the child, sending him to the school at Ammerschwihr, near Kaysersberg, where his mother lived.

In 1460, when he was fifteen years old, Johann entered the University of Freiburg; which had just opened. Two years later he received the baccalaureate, and after two more years was made Master of Arts. He now gave lectures on various writings of Aristotle in the next semester. After graduation, he lectured there for some time on the Sententiae of Peter Lombard, the commentaries of Alexander of Hales, and several of the works of Aristotle. He filled the office of dean of the philosophical faculty for a brief period.

A living interest in theological subjects, awakened by the study of Jean Gerson, led him to the University of Basel in May 1471, recently founded at that time. He obtained the doctorate in 1475. At Basel he became acquainted with Sebastian Brant, with whom he formed a lasting friendship. While at Basle, Geiler preached his first sermons in the cathedral. The magistracy and citizens of that city obtained his appointment to the Freiburg University, of which he was elected rector the next year.

== Professional career ==
For a time he preached in the cathedral of Würzburg. Peter Schott, senator of Strasbourg, an important and influential citizen who had charge of the property of the cathedral, strongly urged Geiler to settle in Strasbourg. At that time preachers were supplied to Strasbourg by the mendicant orders but this led to a frequent change of preachers and friction between them and the cathedral clergy. This led the cathedral chapter, the bishop (then Albert of Palatinate-Mosbach) and the city authorities to prefer having a secular priest as a permanent preacher. Such as post was set up in 1478 and Geiler accepted the invitation to fill it, continuing to preach and work in Strasbourg with few interruptions up until shortly before his death.

The pulpit erected for him in 1481 in the nave of the cathedral, when the chapel of Saint Lawrence had proved too small, still bears witness to the popularity he enjoyed as a preacher in the immediate sphere of his labors, and the testimonies of Sebastian Brant, Beatus Rhenanus, Johann Reuchlin, Philipp Melanchthon and others show the influence of his personal character. He not only preached, as required, every Sunday and feast day in the cathedral, and even daily during fasts, but also, on special occasions, in the monasteries of the city and often outside of the city. His sermons, described as bold, incisive, and denunciatory, abounding in quaint illustrations and based on texts by no means confined to the Bible, taken down as he spoke them, and circulated (sometimes without his knowledge or consent), by his friends, told perceptibly on the German thought as well as on the German speech of his time. It is an indicator of Strasbourg's thriving printing industry that most of Geiler's sermons were printed and widely distributed.

He frequently visited Friedrich von Hohenzollern, Bishop of Augsburg, who was very friendly to him; once he was called to Füssen on the river Lech by his patron the Emperor Maximilian, who desired his advice. He made pious pilgrimages. At Einsiedeln in Switzerland he met the Blessed Nikolaus of Flüe, who was even then well known; another time he journeyed to Sainte-Baume, near Marseille, in order to pray in the grotto of St. Mary Magdalen. A kidney trouble developed, to relieve which he was obliged to annually visit the hot springs of Baden; dropsy finally appeared, and he died on Lætare Sunday 1510 in Strasbourg. The next day, in the presence of an immense multitude of people, he was buried at the foot of the pulpit which had been especially built for him.

== Work and style ==
Among the many volumes published under his name only two appear to have had the benefit of his revision, namely, Der Seelen Paradies von waren und volkumen Tugenden, and that entitled Das irrig Schaf. Of the rest, probably the best-known is a series of lectures on his friend Sebastian Brant's work, Das Narrenschiff or the Navicula or Speculum fatuorum, of which an edition was published at Strasbourg in 1511 under the following title: Navicula sive speculum fatuorum praestantissimi sacrarumliterarum doctoris Joannis Geiler Keysersbergii.

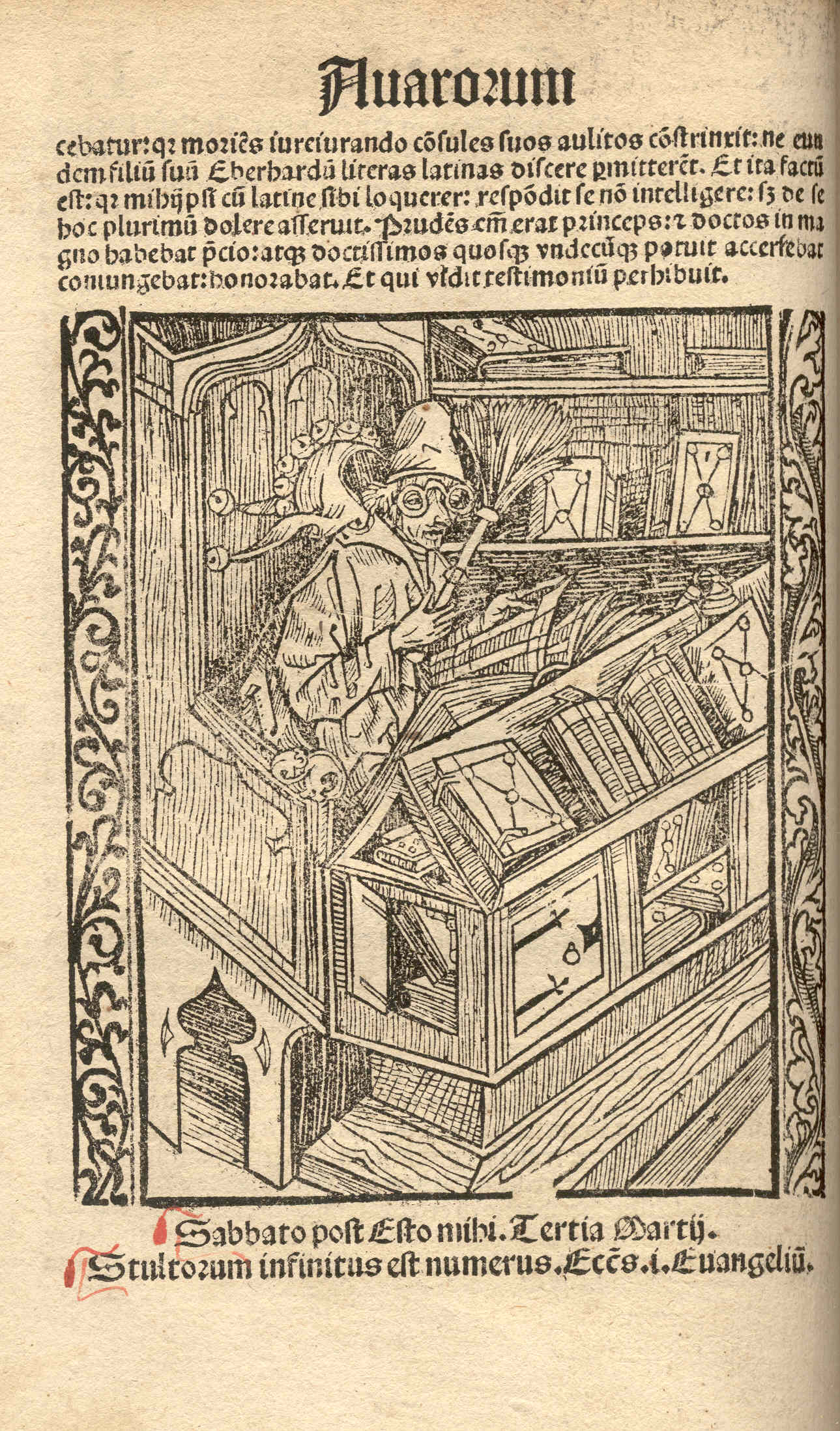
Navicula sive Speculum fatuorum (1510)

The numerous volumes of Geiler's sermons and writings which have been published do not give a complete picture of the characteristic qualities of the preacher. An orator, Geiler sought, without regard to other considerations, was to produce the most powerful effect on his hearers. He prepared himself with great care for the pulpit, writing out his sermons beforehand, as his contemporary Beatus Rhenanus reports; those preparatory compositions were drawn up not in German, but in Latin.

Only a very small part of the sermons that have been issued under his name are directly his. At a very early date his addresses were taken down by others and published. The best critic of Geiler's works, E. Martin of Strasbourg, attempted, in the Allgemeine deutsche Biographie, to give a summary of Geiler's genuine writings; according to him the authenticated writings number thirty-five.

It is not certain that any of the extant works give exactly what Geiler said. It is evident from them that the Strasbourg preacher was widely read, not only in theology, but also in the secular literature of the day. This is shown by the sermons having Sebastian Brant's Ship of Fools, which appeared in 1494, for their theme; these sermons attained the greatest popularity. Geiler displayed also facility in using public events to attract and hold the attention of his hearers.

In originality of speech Geiler is in form, as in time, between Berthold of Ratisbon and Abraham a Sancta Clara. Geiler himself complained bitterly that neither clergy nor laity were willing to join in a common reform. His works are an important source for the history of the civilization of those times. His thoughts were expressed in the language of ordinary life: Geiler's writings are a source for the knowledge of the speech, customs and beliefs of the common people at the beginning of the sixteenth century.

== Posthumous ==
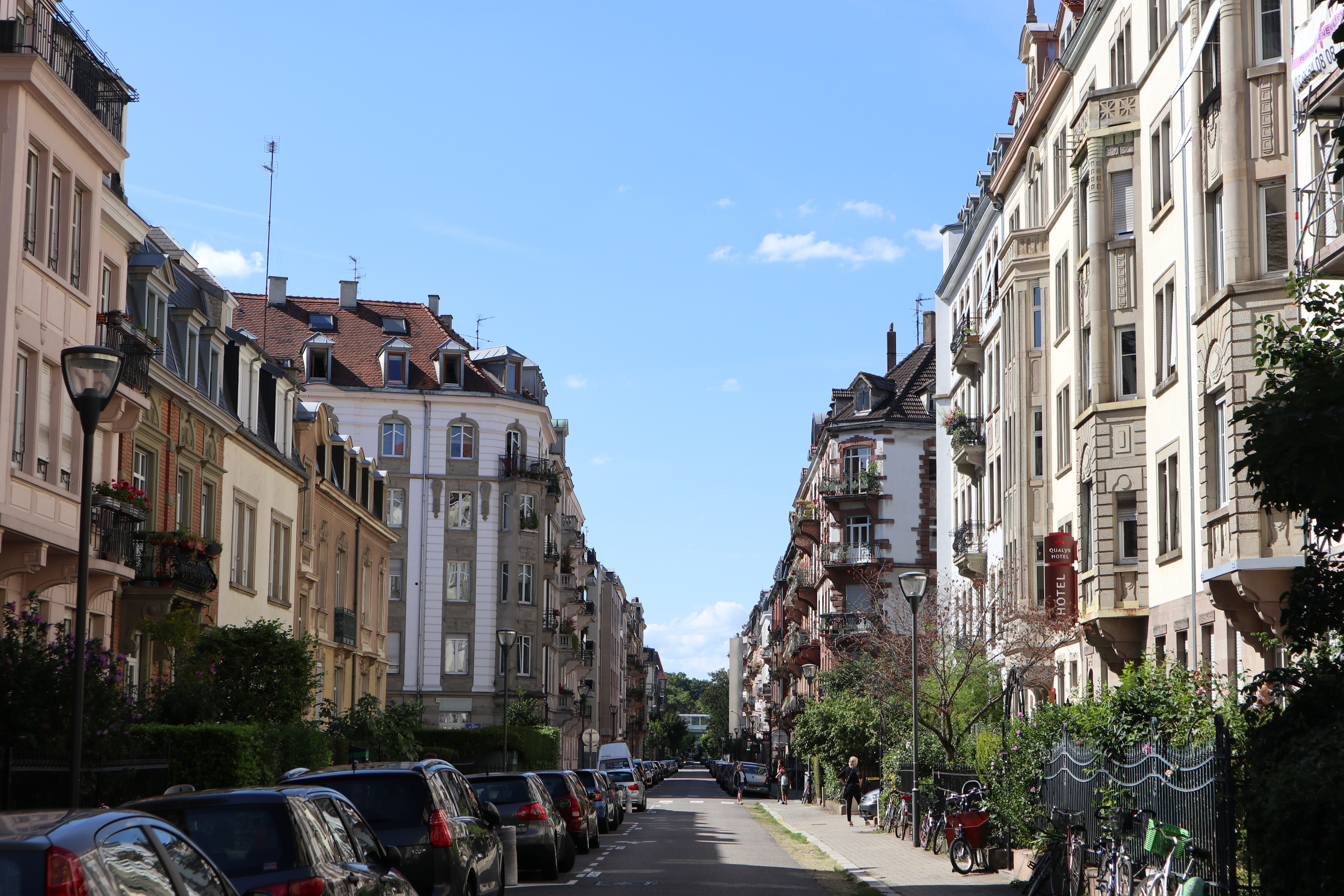
Rue Geiler in Strasbourg

A school in Strasbourg (Lycée Jean Geiler), as well as a street in the Neustadt district of the same town, are named after him.
