= Studia Philosophica (Czech Republic) =

- Discipline: Philosophy
- Language: Czech, English
- Edited by: Jan Zouhar

Publication details
- History: 2009–present
- Publisher: Masaryk University (the Czech Republic)
- Frequency: Biannually

Standard abbreviations
- ISO 4: Stud. Philos. (Brno)

Indexing
- ISSN: 1803-7445 (print); 2336-453X (web)

Links
- Journal homepage

Studia philosophica is a peer-reviewed academic journal that discusses themes and topics related to philosophy. The journal was established in 2009. It is published by the department of philosophy of Masaryk University two times a year and distributed all over the country. The editor-in-chief is Jan Zouhar.

== See also ==
- List of philosophy journals
