= Lawyers in Switzerland =

Legal profession in Switzerland

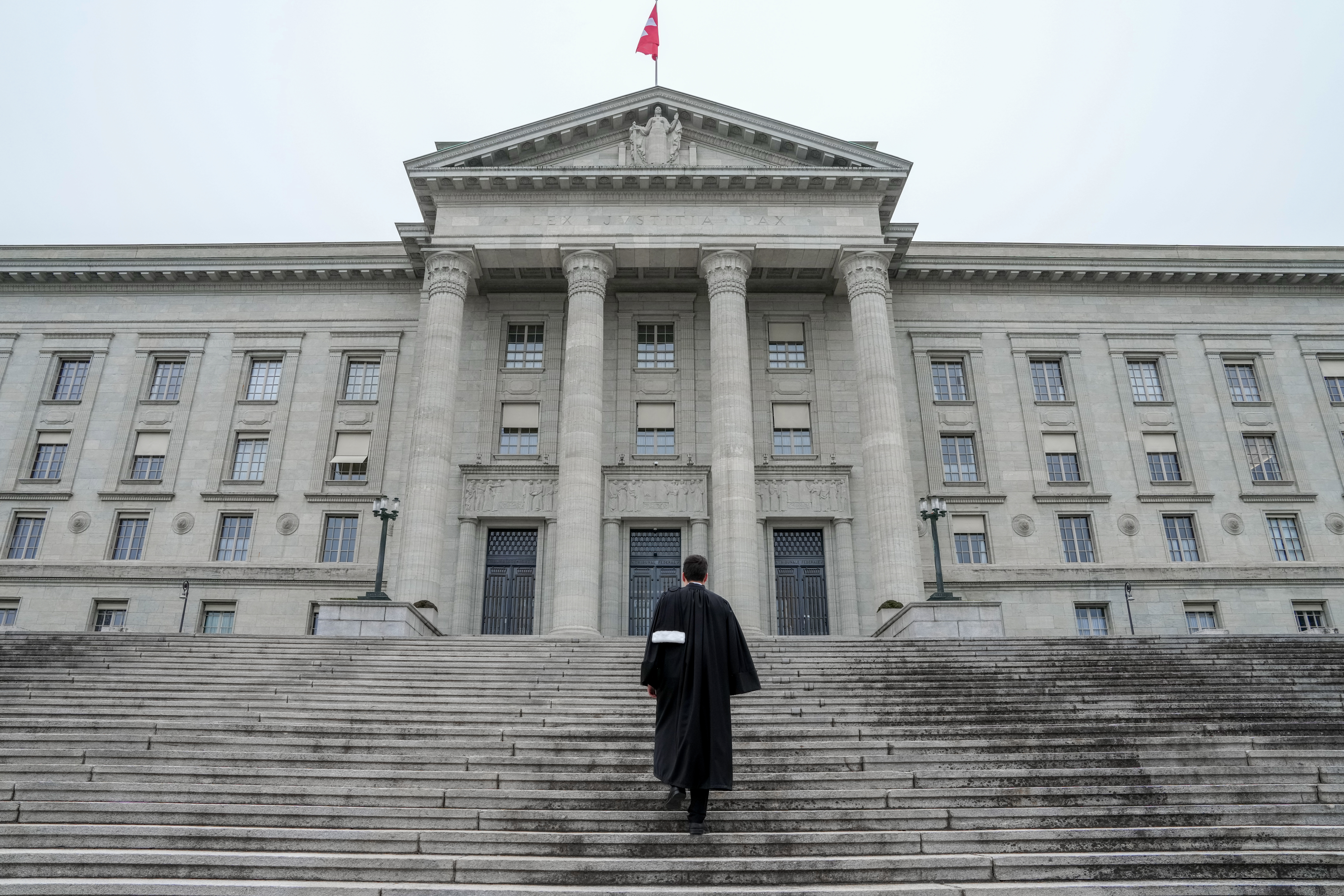
A lawyer in front of the Federal Supreme Court of Switzerland.

Lawyers in Switzerland are legal professionals who represent and advise clients in legal matters and appear before courts. The Swiss legal profession is regulated at the cantonal level, though federal legislation provides a framework for practice throughout the country.

In Switzerland, lawyers are distinct from notaries, who primarily authenticate documents and real estate transactions, and from jurists, a broader category that includes all individuals with legal training, including judges, prosecutors, and legal scholars. The function of the lawyer, formerly a subordinate public office with ill-defined attributions, was transformed in the modern rule of law state through the codification of legal norms into a liberal profession.

== History ==
=== Medieval and early modern period ===
In the territory of present-day Switzerland, the Middle Ages and early modern period knew less the lawyer derived from Roman law, a trained jurist, than the defender in the sense of Germanic law. This Vorsprecher (in French: "pourparlier" or "avant-parlier"), charged with supporting parties before the court so that they acted in proper form, could be designated by the president from among the members of the tribunal. Paradoxically, it was incumbent upon him both to play a role as intercessor and to participate in the elaboration of the verdict. Thanks to his practical experience, but also to his legal knowledge, he soon became the indispensable companion of the parties. His situation and duties are regulated notably in the Schwabenspiegel (Swabian Mirror).

At the beginning of the early modern period, representation in trials became institutionalized and professionalism was gradually established, with freely chosen spokespersons working for remuneration. Defense on substance was added to formal assistance, while representation of parties fell to attorneys. The profession therefore comprised three competing facets, which drew together in the person of the lawyer (in German: Fürsprecher or Advokat depending on the canton).

=== Helvetic Republic and 19th century ===
Under the Helvetic Republic, the bases of a modern procedure were established, but timid attempts at regulating the profession of jurist, notably through a certificate of capacity in the Canton of Léman, could not suppress the principle of free practice. From 1803, the Romansh cantons, Ticino and certain German-speaking cantons profoundly reformed the legal profession, which they desired to control due to its importance for property, civil rights, freedom, and public order and security. Legal training, which could be acquired in a law school, at university or in practice as a clerk or judge, was sanctioned by examinations and the attribution of a cantonal certificate. Other conditions for practice were moral integrity, a minimum age and enjoyment of civil rights. In rural cantons and small cantons, the profession was only regulated between 1890 and 1930.

Liberal and democratic ideals (freedom of enterprise, equality, freedom, clarity of law), as well as aversion to professional privileges and experts, explain why the function of lawyer was generally regulated late in Switzerland. Nevertheless, the level of training did not suffer, because from the 1830s, the pressure exerted by the market and the evolution of law were such that most lawyers pursued university studies either in Switzerland, where new law faculties were created, or in Germany.

In the 19th century, legal codification, procedural systematization, liberal reforms, bureaucratic growth, and economic expansion — along with the increasingly legal character of social relations, which lawyers themselves promoted — helped turn the legal profession into an elite occupation. In numerous domains, the lawyer became almost the equivalent of the jurist. The lawyer's primary task was to defend and represent private clients before the tribunal, as well as to provide them with legal counsel. But the profession was also a springboard for other careers. Numerous lawyers fulfilled public charges parallel to their professional activities, or even full-time (judges, clerks, law professors, civil servants, politicians) or were members of boards of directors, leaders of associations or journalists. Thus they reinforced their position as mediators and as experts in matters of law and in questions touching on freedom, public order, politics, economy and society. As a general rule, Swiss lawyers presented themselves on the market with an offensive attitude. Strong protectionist tendencies or excessive caste spirit were never observed. Members of this prestigious profession were recruited from the middle and petty bourgeoisie, in well-off and cultured circles. Women were admitted to the bar in Zurich in 1898, and throughout Switzerland from 1923.

=== Late 19th century to present ===
A certain homogenization of cantonal norms (which however have never been unified) relative to training, practice and professional ethics appeared at the end of the 19th century. Chambers (or orders in some Romansh cantons) and associations would ensure a form of self-discipline within a profession that must constantly reconcile the established legal order and the interests of its clientele. The objectives of the Swiss Bar Association founded in 1898 (approximately 200 members in 1898, approximately 8,400 in 2010) have scarcely changed over the years. Parallel to efforts to improve rules of law and procedure in the cantonal framework and, from the mid-1950s, in the federal framework, the Federation concerns itself with defending the rights and prestige of the profession, encourages esprit de corps and seeks international contacts. Due to competition from other professions and the growing specialization of their own, often within the framework of collective offices, lawyers have seen their role as universal experts regress, especially from the 1960s onward.

== Bibliography ==
- Gorgerat, Ch. Le barreau vaudois, 1937.
- Siegrist, H. Advokat, Bürger und Staat, 1996 (with bibliography).
- Fellmann, W. et al., ed. Schweizerisches Anwaltsrecht, 1998, 3-53.
- Pahud de Mortanges, R., Prêtre, A. Anwaltsgeschichte der Schweiz, 1998.
