= Johannes Petreius =

German printer (c.1497–1550)

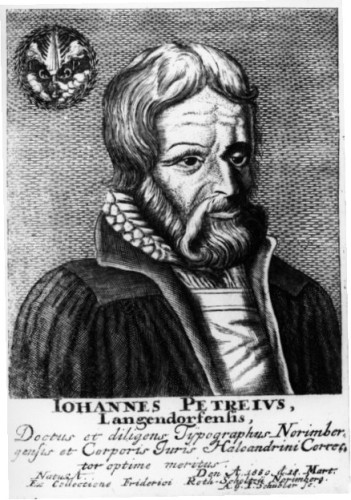
Johannes Petreius

Johann(es) Petreius (Hans Peterlein, Petrejus, Petri; c. 1497, in Langendorf near Bad Kissingen – 18 March 1550, in Nuremberg) was a German printer in Nuremberg.

== Life ==
He studied at the University of Basel, receiving the Master of Arts in 1517. Two years later, he worked as a proofreader for his relative Adam Petri. He became a citizen of Nuremberg in 1523, where he began working as a printer by at least 1524, though his name is only officially entered into the records in 1526. After his death the company was run by Gabriel Hayn.

== Work ==
About 800 publications by him are known, including works in theology, science, law and the classics. He also printed music, using Pierre Attaingnant's single-impression technique. Though the amount of music was small, it was distinguished by its high quality.

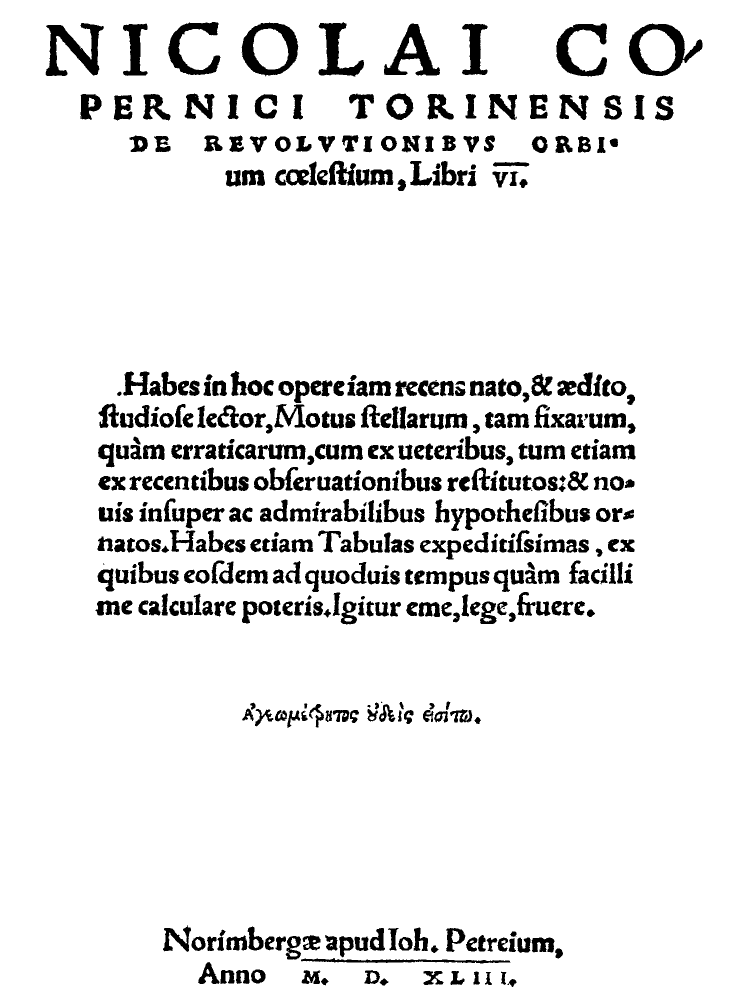
Original edition, Nuremberg 1543

His most famous work is the original edition of Nicolaus Copernicus's De Revolutionibus Orbium Coelestium in 1543, after an initiative of Georg Joachim Rheticus and Tiedemann Giese.

The inclusion of a foreword anonymously written by the Lutheran philosopher Andreas Osiander, stating that the whole work is only a simple hypothesis and intended to facilitate computation, which contradicts the content of Copernicus' work, is a rather controversial feature of the edition by Petreius. Petreius had sent a copy to Hieronymus Schreiber, an astronomer from Nuremberg who died in 1547 in Paris, but left a note in the book about the authorship of Osiander. Via Michael Mästlin, the book came to Johannes Kepler, who uncovered Osiander's deed.

== Bibliography ==
- Georg Rithaymer: De orbis terrarum situa compendium. Johann Petreius, Nürnberg, 1538
- Michael Stifel, Arithmetica Integra. Johann Petreius, Nürnberg, 1544
- Nicolaus Copernicus, De Revolutionibus Orbium Coelestium, Libri VI, Nuremberg, Johann Petreius, 1543
- Girolamo Cardano, Artis Magnae sive de Regulis Algebraicis Liber I, Nuremberg, Johann Petreius, 1545
- Girolamo Cardano, De subtilitate rerum. Libri XXI. Nuremberg, Johann Petreius, 1550
