= Claudius Cantiuncula =

Jurist and humanist (c. 1490–1549)

- Born: c. 1490; Metz
- Died: October 1549; Ensisheim, Alsace
- Other name: Claude Chansonette
- Education: Old University of Leuven, University of Basel
- Occupation: Jurist

Claudius Cantiuncula (baptized Claude Chansonette; c. 1490 – October 1549) was a jurist and humanist from Metz. He taught Roman law at the University of Basel from 1519 to 1524 and was syndic of the city of Basel, which he left in 1524 as an opponent of the Reformation. He then served as chancellor of the bishop of Metz, as an assessor at the Imperial Chamber Court and as a councillor of King Ferdinand I, who in 1540 appointed him chancellor of Further Austria in Ensisheim. In his De ratione studii legalis paraenesis (1522) he argued against the medieval teaching method of the mos italicus and for a humanist jurisprudence.

== Biography ==
Cantiuncula was born around 1490 in Metz, the son of a notary and episcopal secretary. He possibly studied in Leipzig, and from 1512 he studied in Leuven, where in the same year he appears as dean of the college of the students in the higher semesters (baccalaurei utriusque iuris). From 1517 he continued his studies in Basel with a scholarship from the city of Metz. He became a doctor of both laws (doctor iuris utriusque) there in 1519 and taught as professor of Roman law until 1524; in 1519–1520 he was rector of the university. From 1520 he also worked part-time in the chancery of the city of Basel, and from 1522 he was the council's syndic (Ratssyndikus), but as an opponent of the Reformation he left Basel in 1524.

Cantiuncula entered the service of the city of Metz as syndic, but as early as 1525 he moved to Vic-sur-Seille in Lorraine as chancellor of the bishop of Metz. He was often away on diplomatic missions, among others at imperial diets, and in Spain in 1528–1529. In 1532 he became an extraordinary assessor at the Imperial Chamber Court in Speyer, and in 1533 a councillor of King Ferdinand I in Vienna. His professorship of Roman law at the University of Vienna remained vacant, because he was constantly traveling. From 1539 he was a member (Regent) of the Lower Austrian government, and in 1540 King Ferdinand I appointed him chancellor of Further Austria (vorderösterreichischer Kanzler) in Ensisheim.

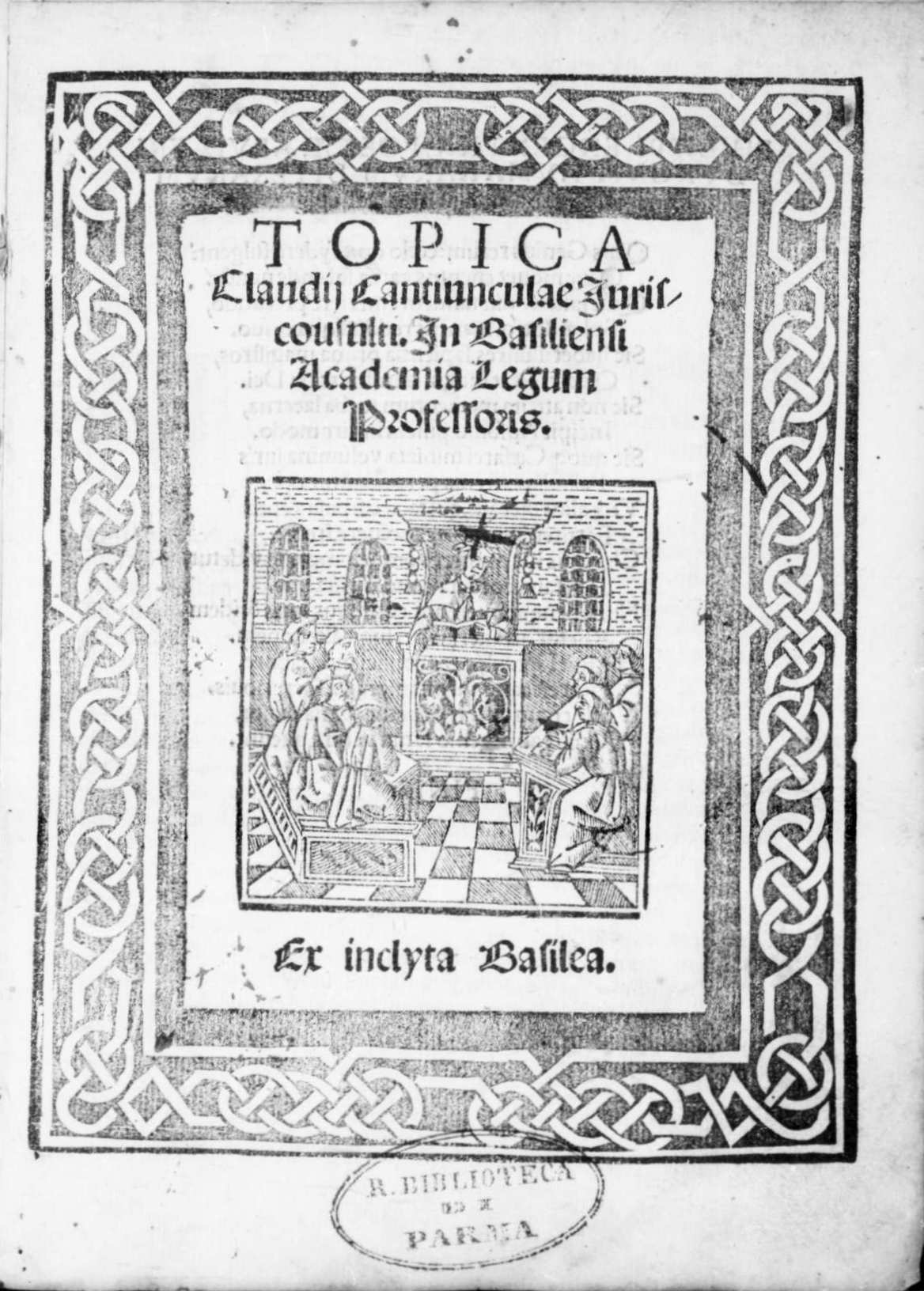
Title page of Cantiuncula's Topica, 1534 edition

Cantiuncula was closely connected with the humanist circle of the Upper Rhine (Ulrich Zasius, Erasmus of Rotterdam, the Amerbach family), and he also took Andrea Alciato and Guillaume Budé as his models. In his De ratione studii legalis paraenesis (1522) he argued against the medieval teaching method of the mos italicus (Bartolus de Saxoferrato, Baldus de Ubaldis) and for a humanist jurisprudence, and he called for deeper study of ancient history and of historical Roman law. In 1546 he wrote an expert opinion on the reform of the city law of Nuremberg. He died in Ensisheim in October 1549.

== Works ==
- Topica Legalia, 1520
- De officio iudicis, 1543
- Consilia sive responsa, 1571

== Bibliography ==
- G. Kisch, Claudius Cantiuncula, ein Basler Jurist und Humanist des 16. Jahrhunderts, 1970
