= Studia Philosophica Estonica =

Estonian scientific journal

- Discipline: Philosophy
- Language: English
- Edited by: Toomas Lott

Publication details
- History: Since 1893
- Publisher: University of Tartu Press (Estonia)
- ISO 4: Find out here

Indexing
- ISSN: 2228-110X (print); 1736-5899 (web)

Links
- Journal homepage

Studia Philosophica Estonica is a peer-reviewed open-access academic journal published by University of Tartu Press. It is compiled by the Department of Philosophy of Tartu University. It publishes scholarly articles in English, German, and Estonian. The journal is indexed in EBSCO databases, ERIH PLUS, and the Directory of Open Access Journals. The editor-in-chief is Toomas Lott. The first volume was published in 1893. The journal has also been published in online form since 2008.

== History ==
The journal's origins date back to 1893, when the proceedings of the University of Tartu began being published under the name Acta et Commentationes Universitatis Tartuensis. During the Soviet era, philosophical collections were published as a separate section of university proceedings, which were renamed in 1993 Studia Philosophica. The journal was first published in its current online form in 2008, but in 2011 two special issues were also published on paper. The journal is divided into volumes containing articles published during one year. As of 2009, the first issue of each volume covers the usual subjects, and later issues are special issues.
