= Johannes Petri (printer) =

Founder of the oldest existing publishing house (1441-1511)

Johannes Petri (1441 Langendorf – 29 April 1511 Basel) was a printer in Basel and the founder of the oldest extant publishing house in 1488.

== Early life ==
Johannes Petri was born in 1441 in Langendorf in Lower Franconia. It is assumed that he learned to read Latin in a monastery. He moved to the nearby Amorbach, where he met Johann Welcker, who later became his printing partner. He then moved on to Mainz, where he trained in a print workshop. Later he may have met German printer Anton Koberger in Nuremberg. He printed his first book in Augsburg. He then travelled to Freiburg, where he sold the books, and found work as a scribe. In about 1480, he came to Basel, where he was employed by Johann Amorbach who had come into ownership of two houses in the Rhine Alley.

== Career ==
In 1488 he became a citizen of Basel, two weeks later he entered the Guild to Saffron which permitted him to open his own workshop in the Ackermanshof in St.Johanns Vorstadt. He cooperated with fellow printers Johann Amerbach and Johann Froben, and the trio became known as Die Drei Hannsen (The three Hannsen, Hanns as abr. of Johannes). Most of his prints were cooperations with the two, except for an edition of the collected works of Ambrose of 1506. The edition of 1978 pages and three volumes included an index and is the only work for which Petri is mentioned as the sole printer. Its editor was Conrad Leontorius. Another printing accomplishment was the collected works of Augustine, a major project for which the three Hanns joined forces for three years. The edition was published in 1506 and 1600 exemplars were shipped to Anton Koberger of Nuremberg. From 1509, the first printers-mark of Johannes Petri depicting a Basilisk holding the coats of Arms from Basel is known. In 1511, he transferred his printshop to his nephew Adam Petri.

== Personal life ==
He married Barbara Mellinger, the daughter of the owner of the Ackermanshof, and also the Vogt of Birseck in 1500. The marriage took place in the Church of the Karthäuser. The two became the parents of six children. With time, he bought the house adjacent to the Ackermanshof from where, at the time, one could see the Black Forest. In 1505, he was exempted from military service in return for providing a replacement.

Petri died on 29 April 1511 and was buried in the cemetery of the Preachers' Church in Basel. An epitaph composed by Beatus Rhenanus was added to his grave on request of Johannes Froben. His wife Barbara died shortly after, and their three children and the printing workshop were later entrusted to Johannes Froben.
