= Amerbach Cabinet =

Collection of the Amerbach family

The Amerbach Cabinet was a collection of artifacts, paintings, libraries, assembled by members of the Amerbach family, most notably by the two law professors of the University of Basel, Bonifacius Amerbach and his son Basilius Amerbach the Younger.

== History ==
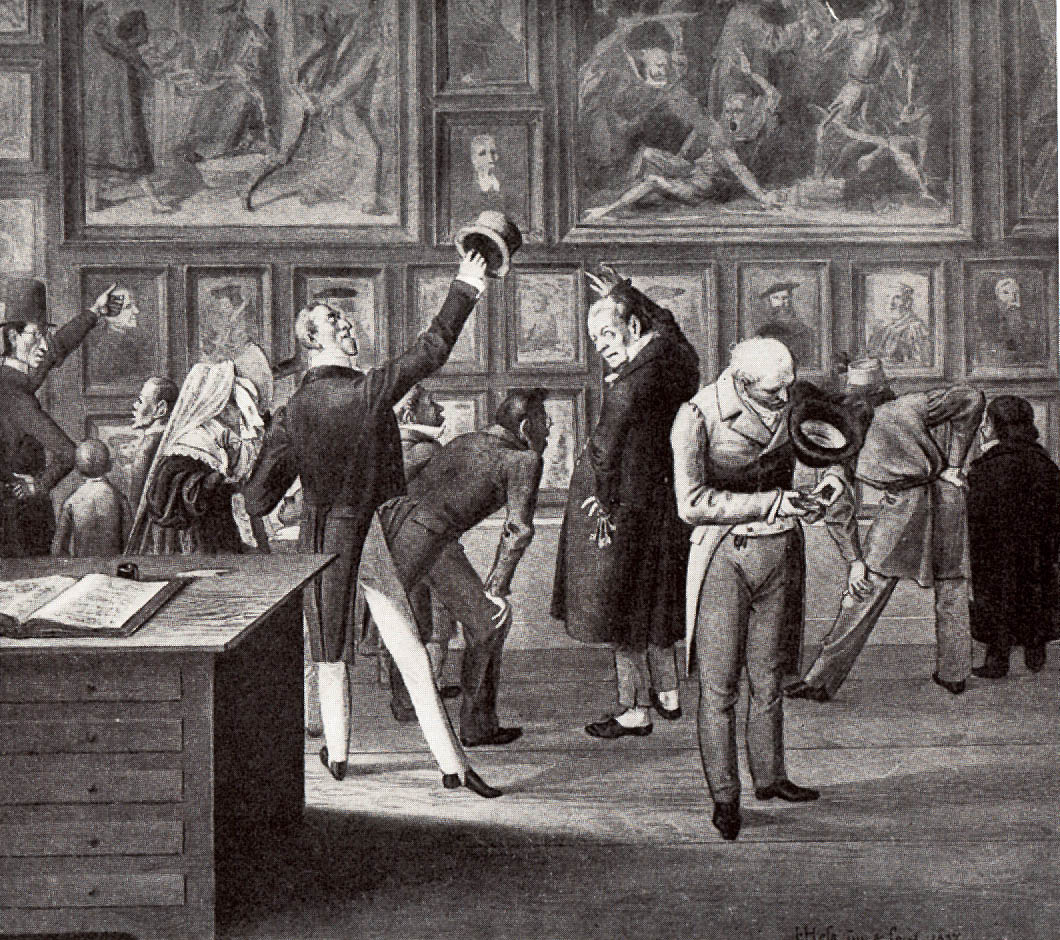
Visitors in the painting hall in the House zur Mücke in 1837

A central piece of the cabinet included the heritage of the Christian scholar Erasmus von Rotterdam for which Bonifacius had commissioned a trunk in 1539. The collection included paintings, sketches, medallions, rare coins, the letters of the Amerbach family, and a library of 9000 books. The library contained more than 2000 theological, 2000 juridical, 2000 philosophical and 1000 historical books. The cabinet included an extensive collection of paintings by Hans Holbein the Younger, which Basilius seemed to have acquired in the late 1570s. It is assumed that they were purchased from the very close environment of Hans Holbeins workshop, as the acquired works also included some by Hans Holbein the Elder, and Ambrosius Holbein. Works by Urs Graf, Hans Baldung Grien, and Niklaus Manuel Deutsch where also included in the cabinet. In 1630, the books were categorized in a new catalogue by the librarian of the University of Basel.

In 1661, the heirs of Basilius received an offer to sell the collection to Amsterdam for 9500 Reichsthaler. This led influential citizens of Basel, the professors of the University of Basel, Johann Caspar Bauhin, and Johann Rudolf Wettstein to encourage a purchase for the city. With the support of the mayor Johann Rudolf Wettstein and Remigius Faesch, the founder of the Faesch Museum the cabinet was acquired by the city of Basel and the University Basel, in November 1661. The price of the purchase was 9000 Reichsthaler, of which two thirds were to be paid by Basel and one third by the university. Following, it was decided that the university was to take care of the cabinet and they stored it in the university building close by the river Rhine. In 1671 the cabinet moved into the House zur Mücke, where the collection initially was open to the public every Thursday afternoon, later on two days a week. According to several reports, it was one of the first public exhibitions in the world. In 1769 the paintings were exhibited in an own hall. In 1833, during the discussions of the partition of the Canton Basel into Basel Country and Basel-City it was decided that Basel City would keep the collection as a whole. Today the collection is divided and accessible at the University, the Kunstmuseum, and the Historical Museum of Basel.
