= Legal humanists =

The legal humanists were a group of scholars of Roman law, which arose in Italy during the Renaissance with the works of Lorenzo Valla 1407– 1457) and Andrea Alciato (1492–1550), among others, as a reaction against the Glossators and the Commentators of the Italian scholastic tradition, the so-called mos italicus jura docendi or the Italian method of teaching law. In the 16th century, the movement reached France (Bourges, where Alciato taught), where it became very influential and known as the mos gallicus jura docendi or the French method of teaching law. Common historiography claims that the legal humanists had a general disdain for the Middle Ages, however their position was often much more nuanced. Overall the legal humanists were markedly characterised in the sharing of a view that legal knowledge and methods rooted in antiquity should be adequately contextualised, hence they were concerned with the authority and accuracy of the Corpus Iuris Civilis. This meant generally in practice legal humanists were critical of the method employed by the glossators and the commentators because in their attempt to apply law in practice, they had moved further and further away from the contextual importance of legal texts.

== Overview ==
This was the time of the Renaissance in Europe, where a certain culture emerged that was seen to seek a 'new birth' of society, though the term 'Renaissance' had not been coined or used to define this historical period until much later. It in fact found it's beginnings in Italian culture. The term Renaissance is French for "rebirth," but its conceptual origin lies in Italy with the word rinascita (or rinascimento). The Italian artist Giorgio Vasari first used rinascita in his 1550 book Lives of the Most Excellent Painters, Sculptors, and Architects to describe the revival of classical art in the 15th and 16th centuries. While the Italian term originated the concept, the French word Renaissance was popularized in the 19th century by historians like Jules Michelet and Jacob Burckhardt to define the broader European cultural movement. The word itself derives from the Latin renasci, meaning "to be born again."

Legal humanists partook in this cultural renewal as such, through what was seen as a return to the principles that underpinned classical society. Whereas religious reformers sought a return to the pure Word, their interpretation rather than a blind faith in the traditional authority of the Catholic Church. In law, the humanists participated in a concurrent movement, seeking a return to classical Roman law. This ultimately involved purifying the texts through philological methods. The humanists had great confidence in the rationality of the mind and so originally this was done through a conjectural knowledge of antiquity. However, Jacques Cujas (1522–1590), or Cujaccius, recognized the importance of studying the best and most original text, and thus used the Florentine manuscript, the oldest known extant source of the Corpus Iuris Civilis. This enabled a better study of the interpolations of the text. However, as more and more interpolations were revealed, the quasi-Biblical status of the texts was undermined, which undermined the work of the humanists.

Since the Renaissance humanists were primarily concerned with a return to classical society, they were not solely interested in the law, but instead in the historical context. Some humanists placed little emphasis on the law except in respect to what it revealed about the Roman society, for example, Alicus. Pure law was thus given a monumental status. However, this resulted in a move away from practical application of the text. It was recognized that Roman law was the product of Roman society. This undermined the humanist movement as at the same time as arguing that Roman law was perfect for today's society, they revealed it was a product of Roman society. The logical conclusion of this was that French law should be a product of French society. The humanists, for example, Hugues Doneau (1527–1591) or Donellus, presumed that Roman law was rational and so tried to find an underlying rational structure. They distinguished sharply between questions of procedure (the means of obtaining an answer) and questions of substantive law (what is due).

== Impact ==
The humanists had little impact on the immediate practice of law. Court advocates and notaries remained faithful to the commentaries because the work of the commentators had been better circulated. Since they already knew the works of the commentators, they had a vested interest in ensuring that they remained the basis of the court system. Consequently, there were fierce rebuttals, such as that of Scipione Gentili. Humanism was largely irrelevant since it was based around the discovery of pure Roman law, and pure Roman law was only appropriate for Roman society.

In the long term, however, humanism did significantly influence legal science. The principle of using the best available text was established and the quasi-biblical authority of the texts was undermined, resulting in the rise of legal science. The systematisation of the texts was both aided and encouraged, giving rise to the Pandectist school. The logical skills of the humanists in their search for interpolations meant that lawyers had skills that were useful for society as a whole. They were thus the natural mediator in Italy when there was no emperor (and they had Imperial authority), they created a comprehensive system of law. When in French the church and crown were opposed, the humanists were able to help the king gain control with their use of logic.

A disputed impact of the humanists was on the law of contract. The Gordley thesis does not consider their work at all, and opponents to this thesis have argued that they were crucial to the development of modern contract law. The humanists and commentators had reached the point where they acknowledged a large number of ways that agreement could be “clothed” in order to give rise to legal action, however, they still maintained that these were exceptions to the general rule that an agreement could not give rise to an action on its own. However, it was only a small step from this to the recognition that generally an agreement would give an action, but there were a few exceptions. That the transition was not made by the commentators is thought to be because of their adherence to the texts. This was undermined by the humanists. Thus, we might expect that the humanists would have brought the change that Gordley credits to the Spanish NeoScholastics. However, there is no evidence that this took place, perhaps because the humanists despised the work of the commentators to such an extent that they were unwilling to effectively build on the foundations laid down by the commentators in this area.

Most of the humanists were Protestants and so died or fled after the St. Bartholomew's Day massacre of Protestants in 1573. However, the direct link that Donellus fled to Leiden (via Germany) and started the Dutch Elegant School, has been questioned by Osler, who points out that the French Humanist school continued after the massacre and that the Dutch Elegant School did not really take off until Noodt at the end of the 17th century.

== Literature ==
- Montheit, Michael L. (January 1997). "Guillaume Budé, Andrea Alciato, Pierre de l'Estoile, Renaissance Interpreters of Roman Law". Journal of the History of Ideas. 58 (1). University of Pennsylvania Press: 21–40. doi:10.1353/jhi.1997.0006. JSTOR 3653986.
- Kelley, Donald R. (1970). "The Rise of Legal History in the Renaissance". History and Theory. 9 (2). Blackwell: 174–194. doi:10.2307/2504125. JSTOR 2504125.
