= Johann Amerbach =

Swiss printer (1444–1514)

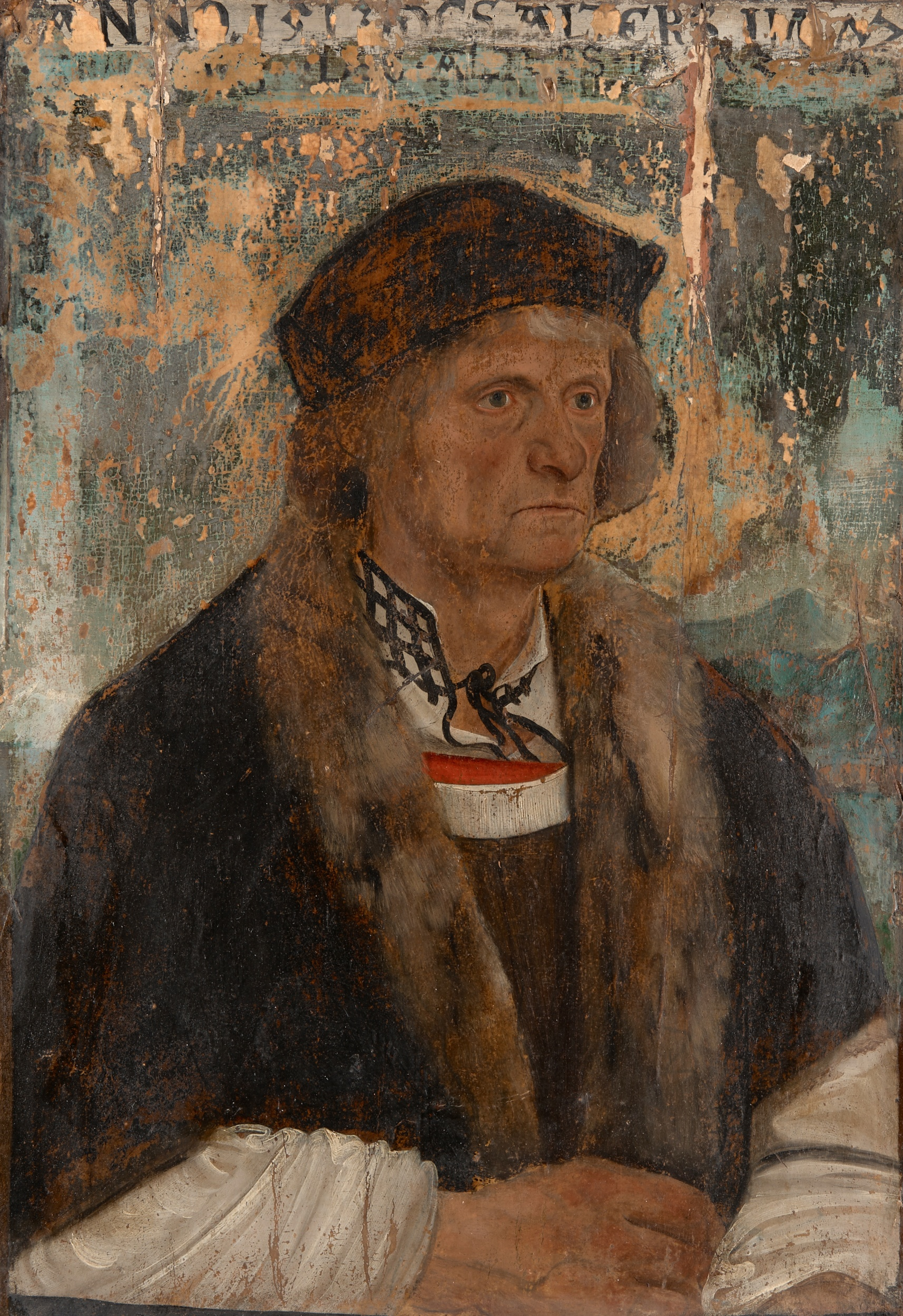
- Born: Johann Welcker; 1444; Amorbach, Germany
- Died: 25 December 1514 (aged c. 70); Basel
- Occupation: Printer
- Relatives: Son: Bonifacius Amerbach

Johann Amerbach (1444 in Amorbach, Germany; 25 December 1514 in Basel, Switzerland) was a celebrated printer in Basel in the 15th century. He was the first printer in Basel to use the Roman type instead of Gothic and Italian and spared no expense in his art.

== Early life and education ==
Amerbach was born in 1444 as Johann Welcker in Amorbach, Odenwald, to the Mayor of Amorbach, Peter Welcker. His family had enough financial means to provide Johann with a good education and sent him to study in Paris. At the Sorbonne in Paris where he graduated with B.A. in 1461 and a Master of Arts, in 1462. His lecturer in Paris was Johann Heynlin. It was during his studies in Paris, where he was surrounded by humanist luminaries such as Heynlein, Johann Reuchlin and Rudolf Agricola, where his interest into humanism is assumed to have developed. Following his studies in Paris, he stayed in Venice, one of the main printing locations at the time and developed an affinity for the printing business. Only later he was given the surname Amerbach. In 1477 where he was a witness between two German printers in a trial in Perugia and purchased punches from a closing printshop in Treviso. In around 1477 he settled in Basel, where he was initially known as the Hans of Venice. When he established his printshop he took on the name Amobach. His first print dates from 1478 and was a by Reuchlin composed lexicon for the latin language. Within a year, he became one of the major printers in town, only equated by one. During the 1480s, Jakob Wolff of Pforzheim was his partner in printing.

== Printing career ==
In 1484 he earned the citizenship of Basel and became the city's most important printer, developing own distribution channels towards Strasbourg and Paris. Additionally he usually visited the fair in Frankfurt am Main twice a year, often accompanied by other printers of Basel. Many of his clients were of a christian religious background and he mainly printed theological books. A further cooperation with the printer Anton Koberger from Nuremberg, opened the market towards Eastern and Southern Europe for his books. In 1486 Johann Heynlin settled in Basel and soon became an influential editor in the press of Amerbach. Heynlein would live in the Carthusian monastery as Amerbachs neighbor, and induce the use of chapters and indexes for the books Amerbach published. With the publication of the edition of the Epistolarum Novum of the humanist Francesco Filelfo in 1486, he became the first printer of a book in the Antique typeface. It was followed by a surge in published books authored by humanists. Between 1487 and 1500, he diversified and more frequently published in the German language. From 1498 to 1502 he printed a seven-volumed bible with a commentary of Hugh of Saint-Cher for Anton Koberger of Nuremberg. The editor of the bible was Conrad of Leonberg. In 1490 Amerbach bought the house "to the chair" in the centre of Basel where he opened an additional printing house and by 1496 he founded together with Johannes Petri and Johann Froben an alliance of three printers in which most of the costs for printing books was divided between either two or three printers. Larger projects like the collected works of Augustinus the three published together for smaller projects they relied on themselves. He and his fellow printers Johann Froben and Johannes Petri became known as the Three Hannsen, as they joined forces for many of their projects and were regarded as the major printers of Basel. Amerbach owned two printing houses, one on each side of the Rhine in Basel.

Even though he sold the printing house in the House to the Chair to Froben in 1507, the alliances cooperation would last until 1512. His successor would be Johann Froben, a close friend to Erasmus of Rotterdam. During his lifetime, he assembled an extensive library which would be included in the Amerbach-Cabinet by his grandson Basilius Amerbach.

== Personal life ==
He married Barbara Ortenberg (a daughter of a politician of Basel) in 1483 and was the father of Basilius Amerbach ("the Elder", 1488–1535) and Bonifacius Amerbach (1495–1562, father of Basilius Amerbach the Younger). His first son Bruno was named after the founder of the Carthusian order. His daughter Margaret was named after Saint Margaret. He was close to the Carthusian order, which led the Monastery St. Margarethental in his neighborhood. He also was the father of a daughter that died before her third birthday. He was buried in the Monastery St. Margarethental.
