= Ulrich Zasius =

German jurist

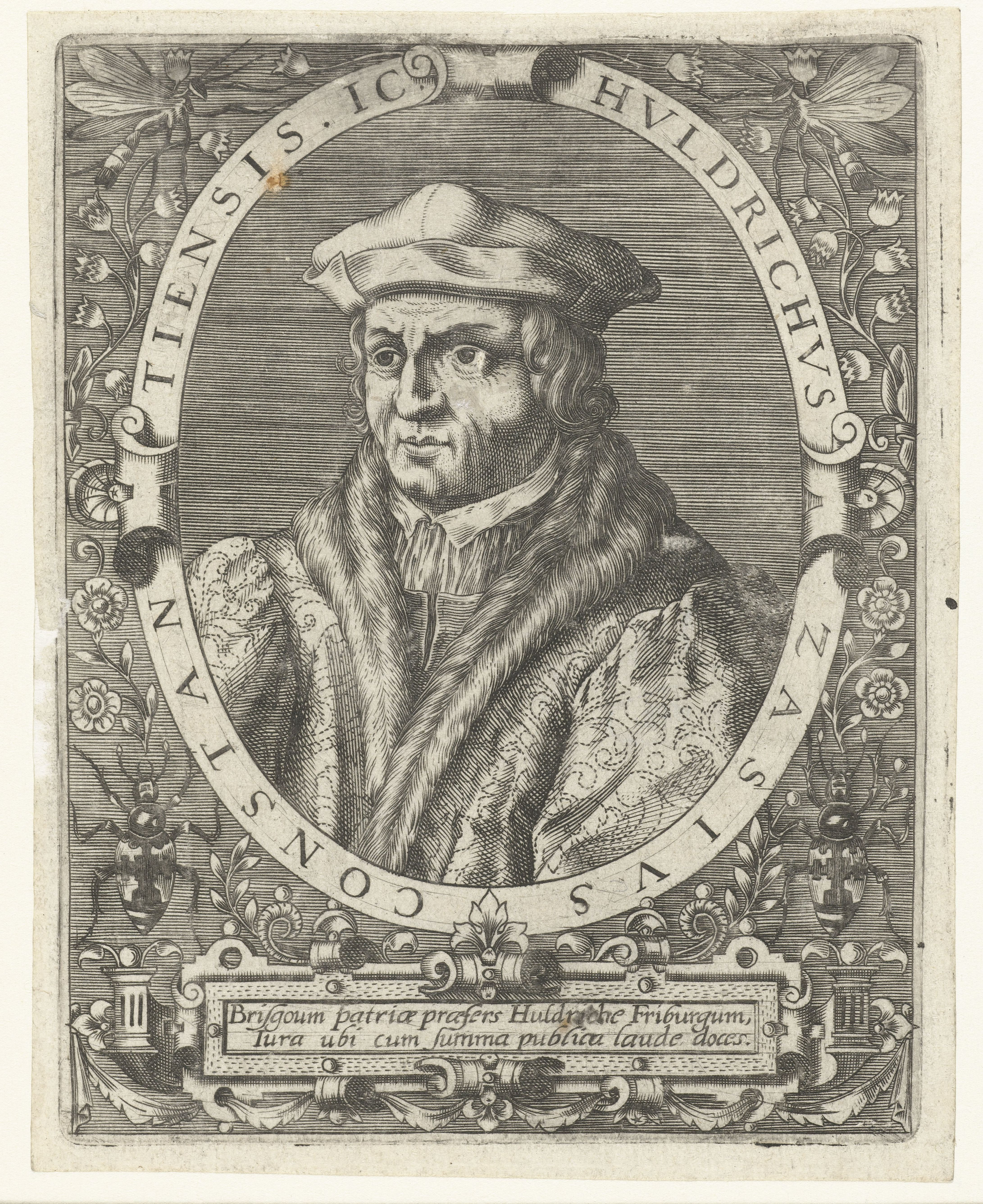
Ulrich Zasius

Ulrich Zasius (1461 – 24 November 1535 or 1536) was a German jurist.

== Biography ==
Zasius was born at Konstanz (current Baden-Württemberg) in 1461.

After studying at Tübingen he first became episcopal notary at Constance, then town clerk at Baden in Aargau in 1489, and at Freiburg in 1493. From 1496 to 1499 he directed the Latin school at Freiburg.

In 1499 he studied law at the University of Freiburg, was appointed lecturer of rhetoric and poetry there in 1500 and professor of jurisprudence in 1506. In 1502 he was also clerk of court at Freiburg. On April 2 of that year, he joined in with an alliance of burghers and scholars to attempt to expel the Jews of Waldkirch. In 1503, he was appointed legal adviser to the university. In 1505 he authored a treatise assaulting Jewish parental rights which was published in Strasbourg in 1508. In 1508, he was appointed imperial counselor. Applying the tendencies of the Humanists to jurisprudence, he scouted the strained and barbarous comments of the glossators and endeavoured to restore the genuine text. It was probably due to the literary controversies which he had with Eck, that he at first favoured the doctrines of Martin Luther. After 1521 he was a zealous opponent of Luther and died a firm adherent of the Roman Catholic faith.

He died at Freiburg in 1535 or 1536. His juridical works were published posthumously (Lyon, 1548, 1550–1; 3 vols., Frankfurt, 1590).

== Works ==
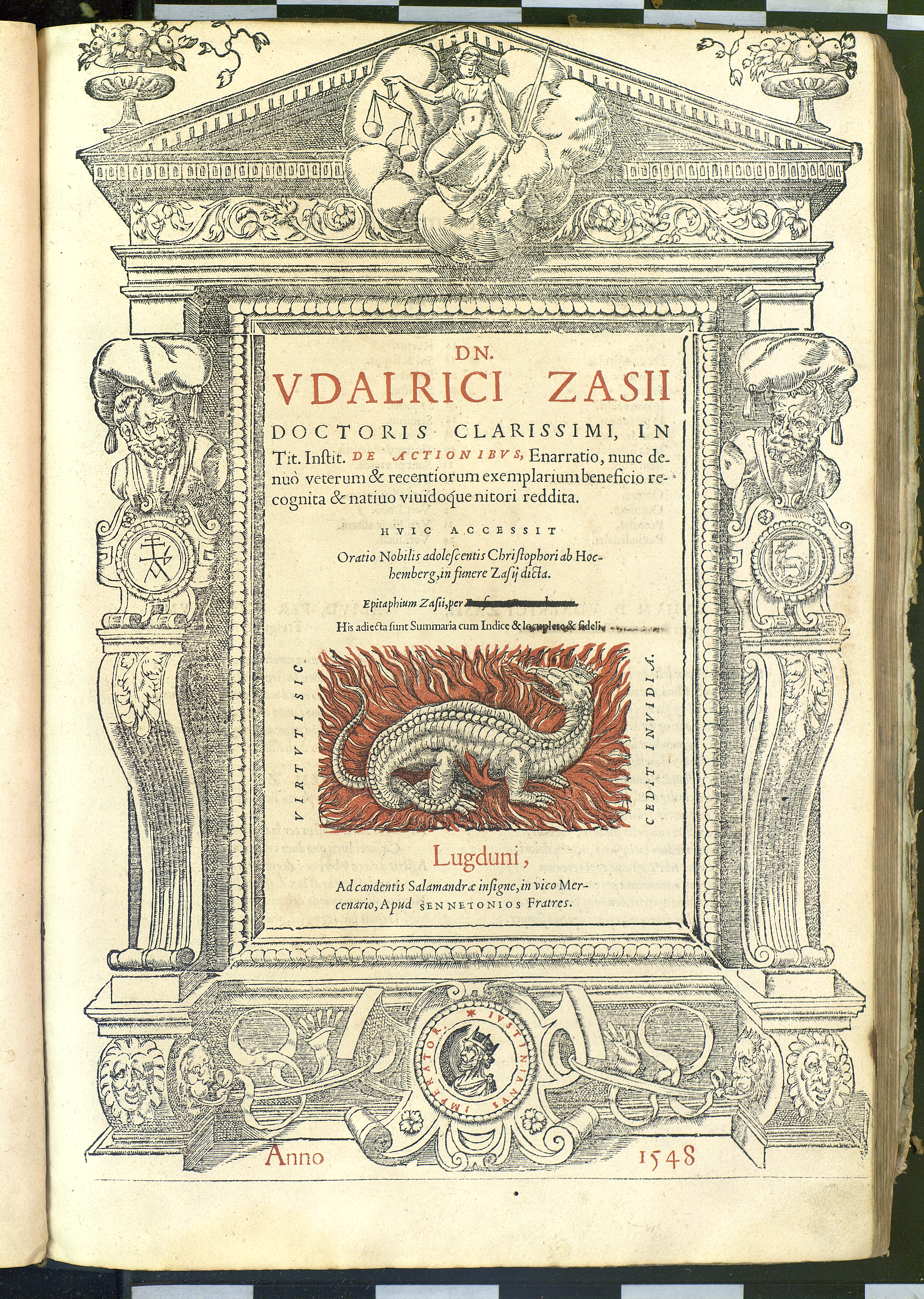
Enarratio in titulum Institutionum de actionibus, 1548

- Enarratio in titulum Institutionum de actionibus. 1548.
- In primam Digestorum partem paratitla.
- Enarrationes in titulum de verborum obligationibus.
- In usus feudorum epitome.
- In sequentes FF. Veteris titulos lecturae.
- Enarrationes in titulum FF. Si cert. petatur.
- In aliquot Digestorum titulos enarrationes.
- In sequentes Digestorum titulos enarrationes.
- In titulum FF. de re iudicata lectura.
- In celeberrimos aliquot titulos FF. enarrationes.
