= Basilius Amerbach the Younger =

Swiss lawyer, professor and historian (1533–1591)

Basilius Amerbach
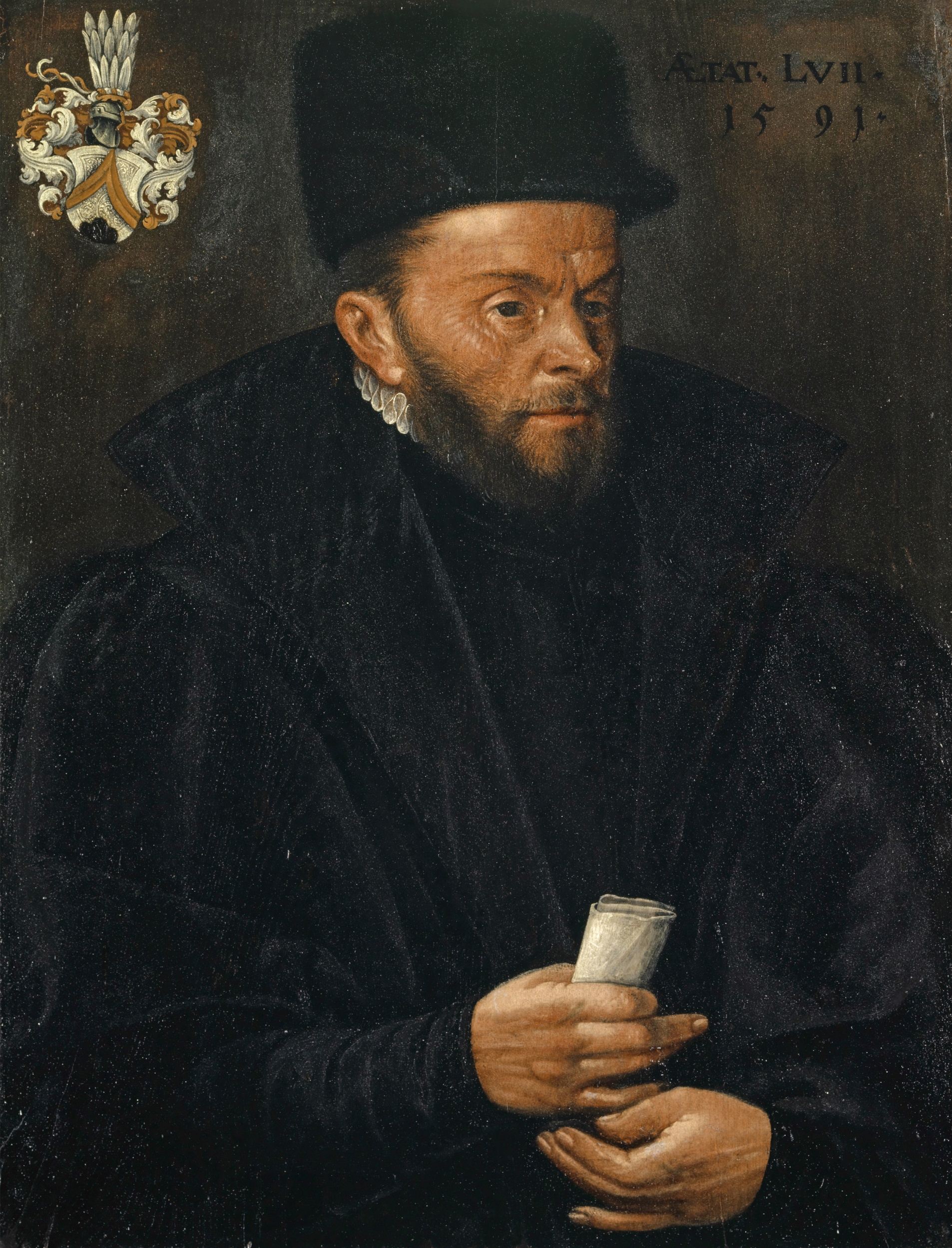
- Born: 1 December 1533
- Died: 25 April 1591
- Other names: Basil Amerbach
- Occupation: Law professor
- Known for: Amerbach Cabinet
- Family: Amerbach

Basilius Amerbach (1 December 1533 – 25 April 1591) was a lawyer, professor and collector from Basel. He was the only son of Bonifacius Amerbach.

He began to study law in 1552 at the University of Tübingen. In 1553 he studied at the University of Padua where his lecturer was Marcus Mantua Benavidius. 1552, he became a law clerk at the Imperial Chamber Court in Speyer. During this time, Basilius surprised his father by choosing to live with Jacob zur Glocke, a goldsmith, rather than a lawyer. After one year as a clerk, he became a professor at the University of Basel.

Upon Boniface's death in 1562, Basilius inherited his father's Kunstkammer, or "cabinet of curiosities." He expanded the collection of artworks, antiques, coins, and wonders. For the coins he had commissioned a special wooden box. His additions to the "Amerbach Cabinet" also included the equivalent of "the entire contents of at least two goldsmiths' workshops." Basilius took an inventory of his collection in 1586, which contained such notable items as an alleged unicorn horn and fifteen paintings by Hans Holbein the Younger.

From 1588–91, Basilius participated in the excavation of the Augusta Raurica, a Roman archeological site near his home in Basel. He was the first member of the group of humanists researching the site to identify the colony's amphitheatre.

His collection has been on display at the Basel Historical Museum, originally called the Haus zur Mücke, since 1671.
