= Wolfgang Lachner =

Bookseller (b. 1465, d. 1518)

Wolfgang Lachner (born 1465 in Neuburg on the Danube, died 1518 in Basel ) was a bookseller and publisher in Basel. He had extensive contacts in Europe and supplied, among others, Erasmus of Rotterdam and Ulrich Zwingli.

Lachner became a citizen of Basel in 1488, where he was traceable from 1485 as a bookseller. Before that, he was probably in Augsburg. At first, from Venice he imported editions of classical and humanist authors among others. From 1493 he started publishing himself. First he left in 1492 in Freiburg with the printer Kilian Fischer Perlustratio in IV libros Sententiarum of Bonaventure with a circulation of 200 print (the first certain pressure in Freiburg). In 1495 he printed in Basel (a commentary of Thomas Aquinas on the Pauline letters). He had two bookstores in Basel and regularly attended fairs in Frankfurt, Lyon and Strasbourg. From 1513 he was the commercial director of the printing works of Johannes Froben (died 1527), who in 1510 had married Wolfgang Lachner's daughter, Gertrude Lachner. He was also involved in the Frobens publishing program: another daughter, Anna, was married in 1524 to the printer Hieronymus Froben. Lachner had two sons and six daughters, along with three other children who died in 1519 from the plague.

He was involved in the publication of works by Erasmus, such as the New Testament, and an Augustinian edition of Erasmus was due to appear with him.

In 1504 he published an edition of the works of Johannes Chrysostomos (printed by Jacob Wolff).

== Literature ==
- Jakob Franck (1883). "Lachner, Wolfgang". Allgemeine Deutsche Biographie (in German). Vol. 17. Leipzig: Duncker & Humblot. pp. 481–483.
- Frank Hieronymus (1982). "Lachner, Wolfgang". Neue Deutsche Biographie (in German). Vol. 13. Berlin: Duncker & Humblot. pp. 377–378. (full text online).
- F. Hieronymus: Wolfgang Lachner. In: Gutenberg-Jahrbuch, Band 60, 1985, S. 145–152
