= Haus zum Sessel =

House in Basel, Switzerland

Coordinates: 47°33′31″N 7°35′11″E

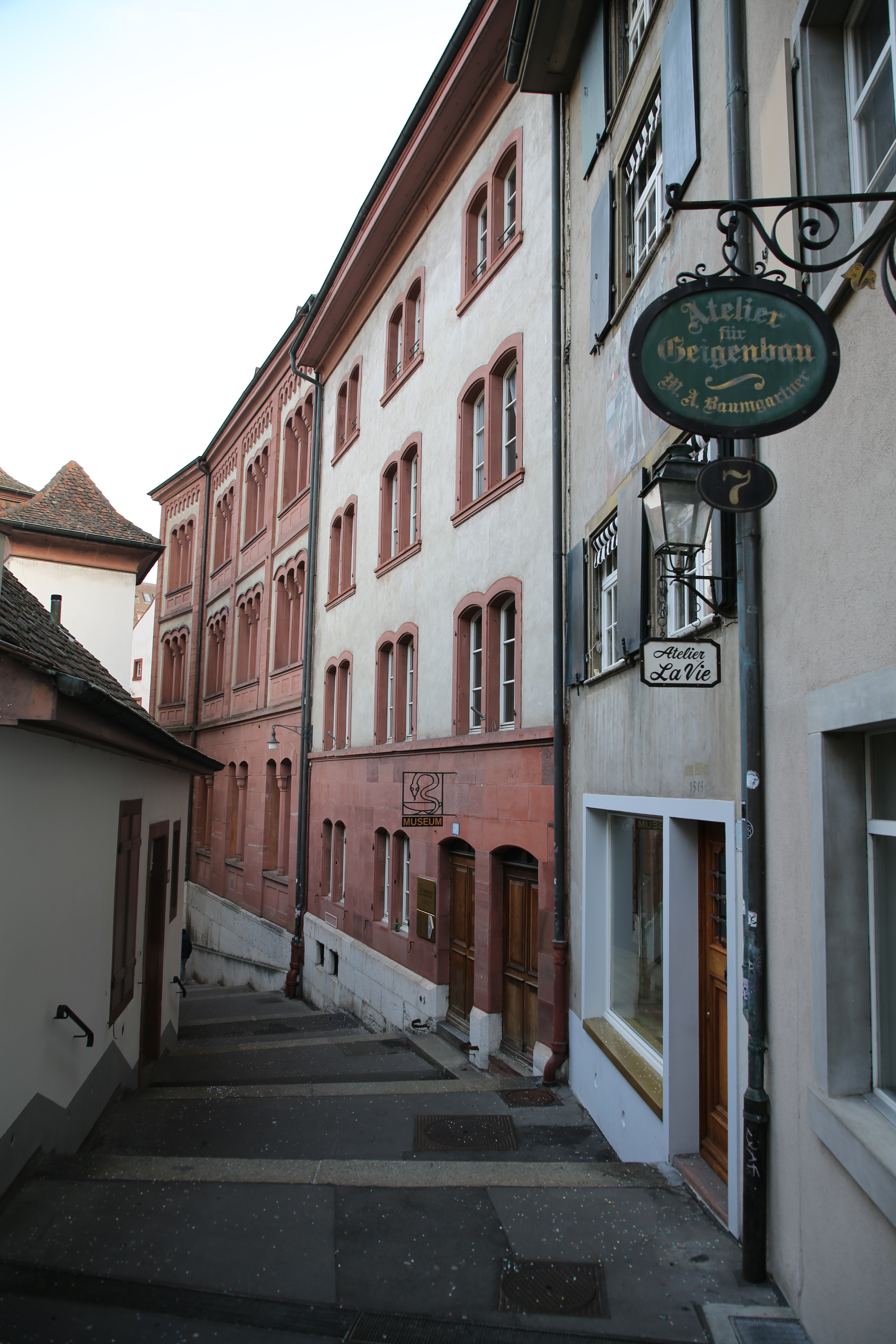
A view of Totengässlein with the Haus zum Sessel in reddish colors.

The Haus zum Sessel at Totengässlein 3 in Basel, Switzerland, was the site of the printing press of Johann Amerbach and his successor Johann Froben.

== Early years ==
A house Zum vorderen Sessel was first mentioned in 1316. Behind, another house was called Badestube unter Krämern. In it, a bath was located which was fed by a fountain in the courtyard.

== Printing house ==
In the late 15th century, Johann Amerbach rented the building and established an additional printing press in the house. In the 1490s he eventually purchased it and further onwards, it became a home for humanist writers and scholars. In 1507 Johann Amerbach sold the Haus zum Sessel to Johann Froben, his successor. Froben employed humanists like Sebastian Brant, Beatus Rhenanus or Johannes Reuchlin as editors and proof readers. Sebastian Münster was entrusted with editing Hebrew texts. Johannes Oecolampadius resided in the house during his proof reading of the Greek-Latin Bible of Erasmus of Rotterdam. Erasmus also resided in the house between 1514 and 1516 and Froben would become the main printer of Erasmus' works, 148 titles are recorded. Froben's son Hieronymus Froben would become his successor and joined forces with the printers Johann Herwagen and Nicolaus Episcopius. Episcopius would marry Froben's daughter Justina in 1529. The joint venture did not last, and Hiernoymus Froben established a new printing house in the Bäumleingasse. The Episcopius family printed in the building until 1599 when Eusiebius Episcopius, the grandson of Nikolaus Episcopius, died. For some years afterward, little is known about the house except the names of three subsequent owners.

== Education ==
In 1801, the pedagogue Johann Georg Tobler opened a boys' school in the house, which operated until 1803. In 1814, in the building the first so-called "daughters school" of the state in Basel was established. The young women were educated in geography, history, French, German and religion in the mornings and in handicrafts in the afternoon. The school lived through financially challenging times as it did not count with a stable amount alumni. In 1856, the building was renovated by Amadeus Lukas Merian. Afterwards, the number of students rose rather fast and the building became too small. In 1884 the school left the building at the Totengässlein and moved to the Kanonengasse. In 1897 the school for women education moved in with about 1300 students. The school was founded with the support of the Gesellschaft für das Gute und Gemeinnützige (GGG). The school was deemed more appropriate for some citizens in Basel, who deemed the one from the state as too intellectual and less practical. In the one from the GGG, the women were again prepared more for leading the household. The focus was more on cooking, sewing, healthcare and gardening. But also for the school for women education the building became too small in the year 1916, when it moved with 1800 students to a new building at the Kohlenberggasse.

== University of Basel ==
In 1917, the University of Basel purchased the building and established a pharmacological institute. Its first professor was Karl Heinrich Zörnig. Since 1924, the Pharmacy Museum of the University of Basel is located in the building. In 1925 Josef Anton Häfliger donated his personal pharmacological collection to the university and became a part of the Pharmacy Museum. In 1938 and 1952 Tadeusz Reichstein was the director of the pharmacological institute. In Basel, Reichstein isolated the Cortisone, for which he received the Nobel Prize in Chemistry in 1950. In 1999, the pharmacological institute moved to the Klingelbergstrasse, but the museum stayed.
