= Against Calvin's Booklet =

Anti-Calvinist text

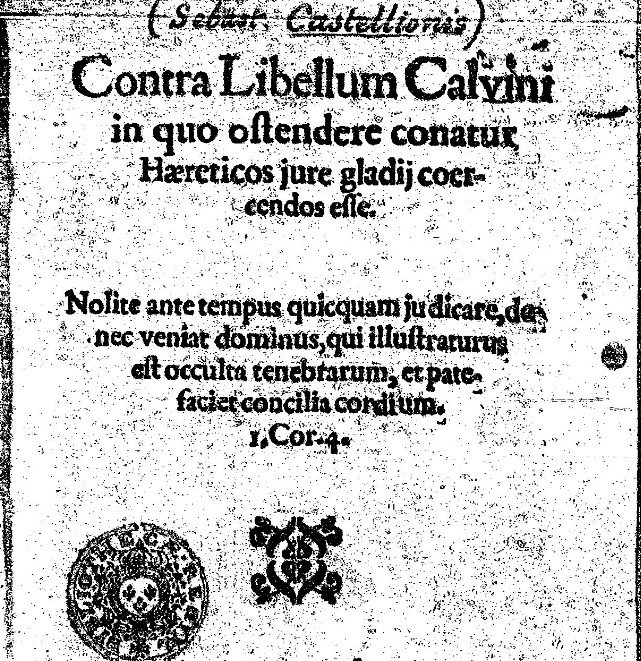
- Author: Sebastian Castellio
- Publication date: 1554 (1612)

Against Calvin's Booklet, in its full form Against Calvin's Booklet in which he attempts to show that heretics must be suppressed by the right of the sword (in Latin: Contra libellum Calvini in quo ostendere conatur haereticos jure gladii coercendos esse), is a theological treatise in the form of a dialogue written by Sebastian Castellio in June 1554 and published posthumously in 1612.

In this text, written shortly after the Treatise on Heretics, Castellio portrayed himself as an opponent of John Calvin and attacked the persecutions aimed at individuals perceived as heretics. He defended freedom of religion. The work is famous for being the source of Castellio's most well-known quote: "To kill a man is not to defend a doctrine, it is to kill a man." The text is considered one of the earliest debates on the issue of religious tolerance.

== History ==
=== Context ===
Castellio was a humanist Protestant theologian who started in Strasbourg, Lyon and then moved to Geneva to assist John Calvin. Quickly disillusioned by the nascent theocracy, he became increasingly critical of the preacher. This opposition reached its peak with the execution of Michael Servetus, a Protestant theologian perceived as heterodox, who was burned at the stake in Geneva. It appears, though not with complete certainty, that Castellio may have tried to save Servetus's life before his execution.

Refugeed in Basel, Castellio began to write against Calvin. In 1553, he published the Treatise on Heretics, where he opposed the theology underpinning the persecutions of heretics.

=== Writing ===
Castellio wrote Against Calvin's Booklet shortly after the Treatise on Heretics, which explains the ideological proximity between the two works. It is a collection of articles in which Castellio debates the positions held by Calvin. He first presents them by quoting Calvin's Institutes directly, then contradicts or critiques them. The text is written in Latin. Like the Treatise on Heretics, it is a "declaration of war" against Geneva and Calvin, finalizing the split between the two former colleagues.

His most famous quote can be found in Article 77 of the treatise:

"To kill a man is not to defend a doctrine, it is to kill a man. When the Genevans killed Servetus, they did not defend a doctrine, they killed a man. The defense of a doctrine is not the magistrate's business (what does the sword have to do with doctrine?). It is the business of doctors. The magistrate's business is to defend the doctor as he defends the peasant, the artisan, the physician, anyone else, against injustices. Therefore, if Servetus had wanted to kill Calvin, it would have been right for the magistrate to defend Calvin. But Servetus fought with arguments and writings: he should have been fought with arguments and writings."

The text was not published during Castellio's lifetime and circulated in manuscript form before its first edition in 1612.

== Analysis ==
=== Theses Defended ===
Castellio defends complete impunity for heretics, even though he does not particularly sympathize with their ideas. The attacks against Calvin are numerous; he accuses him, in particular, of having fallen into pride and excess. The author also targets the theoretical foundations that his opponent establishes to justify the execution of heretics. It seems that Castellio is strongly opposed to the death penalty in all cases, which might categorize him, perhaps somewhat anachronistically, as an abolitionist.

=== Legacy ===
Baruch Spinoza was influenced by his ideas. The text is considered one of the earliest debates on the issue of religious tolerance.

In 1936, Stefan Zweig published Conscience against Violence, a biography of Castellio where he paid homage to him.
