= Mellet (disambiguation) =

Mellet is a village in Hainault, Belgium.

Mellet may also refer to:

- Daniel Mellet (1923–2017), Swiss football referee
- Paul-Alexis Mellet (born 1970), a French early modern historian
- Troye Sivan Mellet (born 1995), Australian singer-songwriter

== See also ==
- Mellet v Ireland, a 2016 finding from the United Nations Human Rights Committee
