= Castellio Bible =

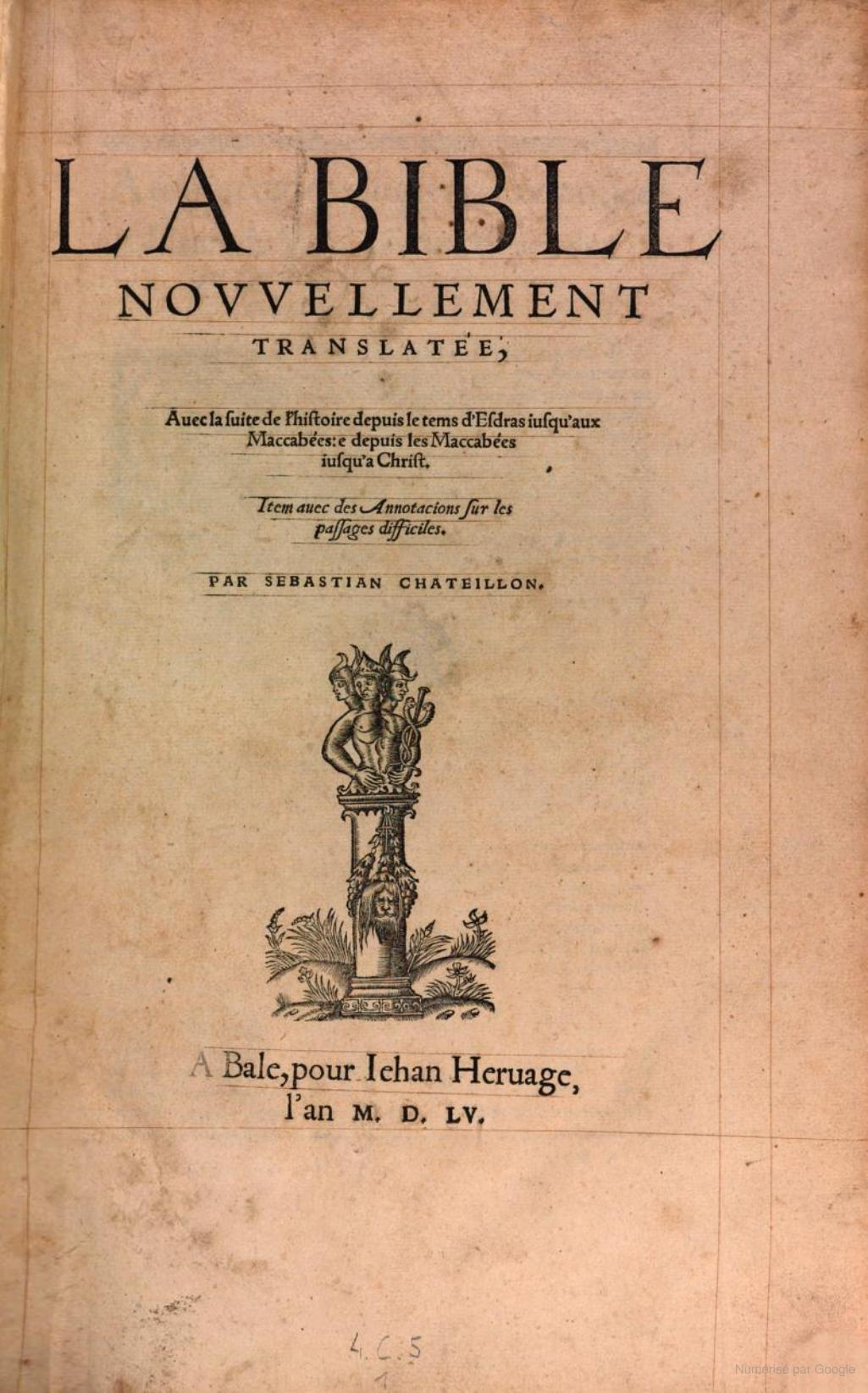
- Full name: French: La Bible nouvellement translatée, avec la suite de l'histoire depuis le tems d'Esdras jusqu'aux Maccabées : e depuis les Maccabées jusqu'à Christ
- Other names: Idiot Bible
- Language: French
- Complete Bible published: 1555
- Authorship: translated by Sebastian Castellio
- Textual basis: Hebrew and Greek
- Publisher: Johann Herwagen

The Castellio Bible, also known as the Idiot Bible, in full The Bible newly translated, with the continuation of history from the time of Ezra to the Maccabees, and from the Maccabees to Christ (in French: La Bible nouvellement translatée, avec la suite de l'histoire depuis le tems d'Esdras jusqu'aux Maccabées : e depuis les Maccabées jusqu'à Christ), is a French translation of the Bible made by Sebastian Castellio and published in 1555 by Johann Herwagen in Basel. It is, along with the Olivetan Bible, one of the earliest French Bibles based on Hebrew and Greek rather than the Latin Vulgate. If it quickly fell into obscurity after its publication, it innovated in many perspectives regarding the translation of the Bible, starting with its central focus on being understandable to the widest possible audience.

== History ==
=== Context ===
Castellio was a Protestant humanist theologian who initially worked in Strasbourg before moving to Geneva to assist John Calvin. Quickly disillusioned by the nascent theocracy, he grew increasingly critical of Calvin and left the town. He later took refuge in Basel and obtained a teaching position in Ancient Greek, which allowed him to dedicate himself to his translation of the Bible.

In 1551, he translated the Bible in Latin, though this translation presented significant differences with the French translation of 1555.

=== Composition ===
Unlike Olivétan, Castellio aimed for the Bible to be understood by as many people as possible. Therefore, he consciously decided to incorporate colloquial forms into his translation, which was a revolutionary choice in Bible translation at that time. According to recent research, it seems that Castellio attempted to create a language for the simple-minded and tried to establish a sort of new language. This focus on colloquial language was announced in Castellio's introduction, where he stated that his Bible was intended for the laymen (idiots in the original Early Modern French), which led to his translation being incorrectly nicknamed the Idiot Bible as a result of the word becoming derogatory via the euphemism treadmill:

As for the French language, I have primarily considered the laymen, and thus I have used common and simple language, and as understandable as possible. For this reason, instead of using Greek or Latin words that are not understood by the common people, I have sometimes used French words when I could find them; otherwise, I have coined new words from French out of necessity, and I have coined them so that they can be easily understood once one hears what they mean. For example, in sacrifices, I used the word "burning" in place of "holocaust", knowing that a layman does not understand and cannot for a long time understand what "holocaust" means. But if one tells them that "burning" is a sacrifice in which what is sacrificed is burned, they will quickly grasp the word through the meaning of "burn", which they already understand.

This approach made the work particularly striking and remained a unique attempt in the history of French Bible translation until much later periods. As one of his translation innovations, Castellio introduced a dialogic form into the text, treating some biblical episodes as simple conversations, with figures speaking to one another. He also avoided overly pompous or lofty terms.

== Text and transcript ==
Here is the beginning of the text of the Leviticus, its literal translation in English and the English New International Version :

Original	Literal English translation	NIV version
1. Le Seigneur appella Moyse, e parla a lui du pavillon des oracles en cette maniere : 2. Parle aux enfans d’Israel, e leur dit ainsi : Un homme de vous qui fera offrande au Seigneur (or quand vous ferez voz offrandes de bétail, vous les ferez de la vacherie ou de la bergerie); 3. si son offrande êt un brulage de la vacherie, il amenera un mâle sans tache, e le menera a l’entrée du pavillon des oracles, pour s’acquerir la grace du Seigneur; 4. e mettra sa main sur la tête de laditte bête, afin qu’en apaisant Dieu par celle bête, il soit mis en grace.; 5. E tuera on le fis de vache devant le Seigneur : e les fis d’Aharon prêtres apporteront le sang, e l’épandront sur l’autel a l’entour, qui êt a l’entrée du pavillon des oracles.	1. The Lord called Moses, and spoke to him from the pavillon of oracles in this manner: 2. Speak to the children of Israel, and say to them: A man among you who makes an offering to the Lord (when you make your offerings of livestock, you shall make them from the cowly or the sheeply); 3. If his offering is a burning from the cowly, he will bring a male without stain, and bring it to the entrance of the pavillon of oracles, to gain the grace of the Lord.; 4. And he will lay his hand on the head of the said beast, so that by appeasing God through this beast, he may find favor.; 5. And he shall kill the son of the cow before the Lord: and Aaron's sons, priests, will bring the blood and sprinkle it around on the altar that is at the entrance of the pavillon of oracles.	1. The Lord called to Moses and spoke to him from the tent of meeting. He said, 2. “Speak to the Israelites and say to them: ‘When anyone among you brings an offering to the Lord, bring as your offering an animal from either the herd or the flock.; 3. “‘If the offering is a burnt offering from the herd, you are to offer a male without defect. You must present it at the entrance to the tent of meeting so that it will be acceptable to the Lord.; 4. You are to lay your hand on the head of the burnt offering, and it will be accepted on your behalf to make atonement for you.; 5. You are to slaughter the young bull before the Lord, and then Aaron's sons the priests shall bring the blood and splash it against the sides of the altar at the entrance to the tent of meeting.

== Legacy ==
The text was misunderstood and attacked by his contemporaries, who saw it as a grave disrespect to the Biblical text, and it gradually fell into obscurity, even though it inspired some later Protestant figures. In Geneva, the Bible was censored by the Calvinist authorities.

The Castellio Bible was reedited by Bayard in 2005 for its 450 anniversary.
