= Pharmacy Museum of the University of Basel =

Museum in Switzerland

Coordinates: 47.558615°N 7.586128°E

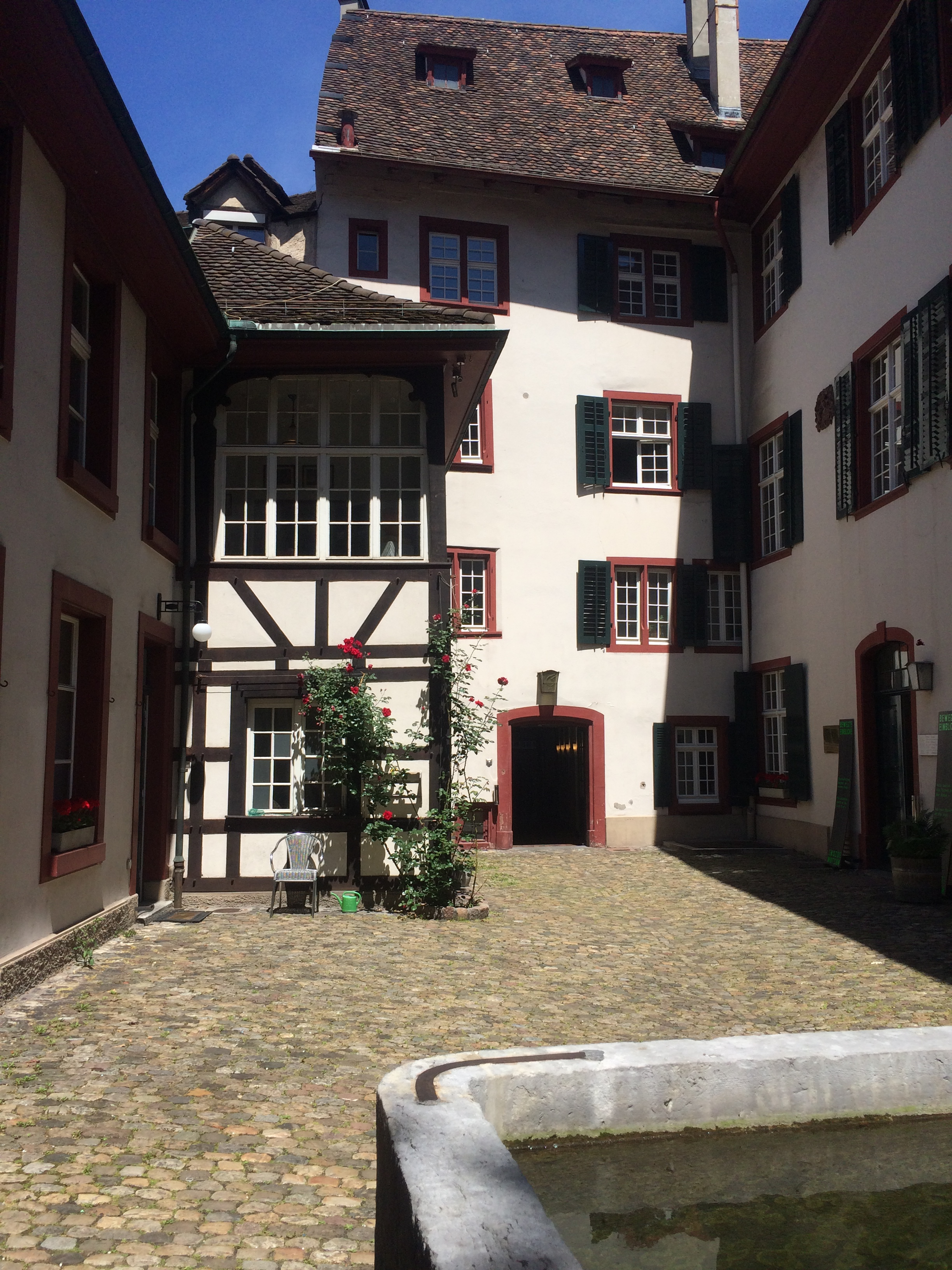
Pharmacy Museum Basel; view of the courtyard. On the right, the house »Zum Sessel«

The Pharmacy Museum of the University of Basel (Pharmaziemuseum der Universität Basel, formerly Pharmazie-Historisches Museum der Universität Basel, originally Sammlung für das historische Apothekenwesen) shows in its permanent collection the history of medicinal remedies and their preparation. Designed as a collection of specimens for study purposes, the museum was founded in 1924 by Josef Anton Häfliger (1873–1954) and has been preserved to this day in its original form as a 'scientific cabinet'.

The museum is one of the largest and most significant collections of pharmaceutical objects and the history of pharmacy. It contains pharmaceutical ceramics, complete fixtures and fittings from historical pharmacies, an alchemical laboratory, mortars, historical first aid kits, books, medications used in the past, and everything related to the preparation of medicinal remedies.

== History ==
»Zum Vorderen Sessel«, the building that houses the museum, is located in the historic centre of Basel, halfway between the market square and St Peter's Church. First mentioned in 1316 as the »Unter Krämern« bathhouse, it is rich in history. From 1480, the renowned printer Johannes Amerbach lived there; he was the ancestor of the famous academic Amerbach family. In 1507, the house was acquired by Johannes Frobenius, probably the most famous printer of his day. Erasmus von Rotterdam lived and worked there from 1514 to 1516 as Froben's guest.

The printers were joined by famous illustrators such as Hans Holbein the Younger and his brother Ambrosius, and the engraver Urs Graf. In 1526 and 1527, the famous physician and alchemist Theophrastus von Hohenheim, who styled himself Paracelsus, worked there; he had just moved to Basel and was Froben's family doctor.

»Zum Sessel« House has hosted the Pharmacy Museum of the University of Basel since 1925. The aim of the museum is to explain the scientific, art historical and ethnological aspects of the history of pharmacy.

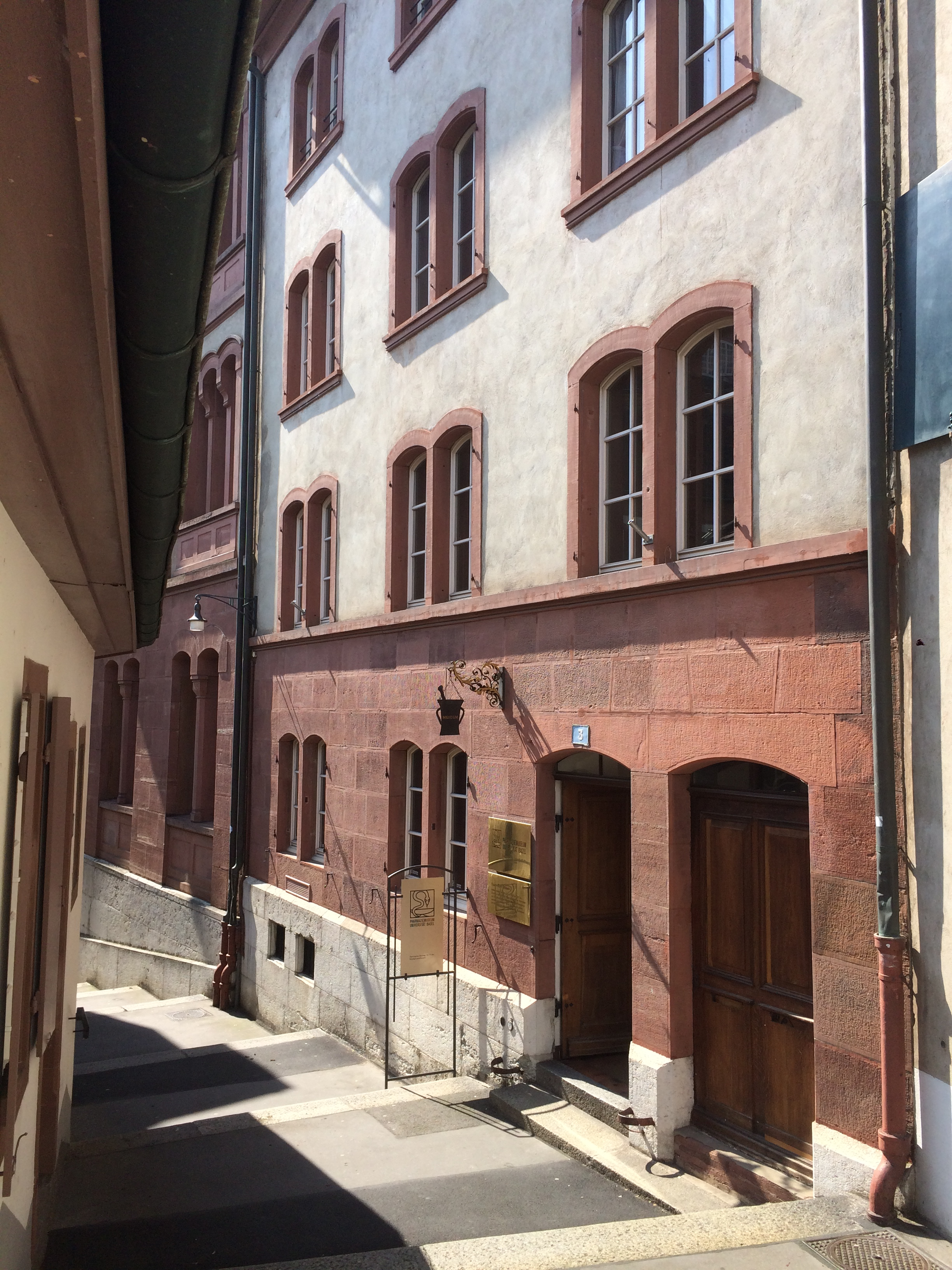
The entrance to the Pharmacy Museum in Totengässlein

== Founder and Curators ==
- 1924: Josef Anton Häfliger (Founder)
- 1942–1972: Alfons Lutz
- 1972–1979: Lydia Mez-Mangold
- 1979–1986: Laurentia Leon
- 1986–2018: Michael Kessler
- Director since January 2020: Philippe Wanner (2018–2020 curator a. i.)

== Collection ==
The museum dates back to a time when collections of objects were still essential in scientific teaching and research. It has its origins in the private collection of Josef Anton Häfliger (1873–1954), a pharmacist and lecturer in practical pharmacy and the history of pharmacy. In 1924, he donated his collection of ancient apothecary vessels, obsolete drugs, prescriptions, woodcarvings, paintings and books to the University of Basel. Heinrich Zörnig, director of the 'Pharmazeutische Anstalt' (Department of Pharmacy) founded in 1917, provided several rooms to host the collection. By establishing the collection in the Department of Pharmacy, Häfliger was able to make reference to historical developments as he introduced students to pharmaceutical practices. Objects were used as aids in teaching the history of pharmacy and to illustrate the techniques used in the preparation of remedies. The growth of the collection was closely associated with developments in pharmaceutical practice at a time (the first half of the 20th century) when the whole pharmaceutical sector - from research and production to retail sales - was undergoing a profound transformation.

== Exhibition ==
=== Remedies, drugs and medications ===
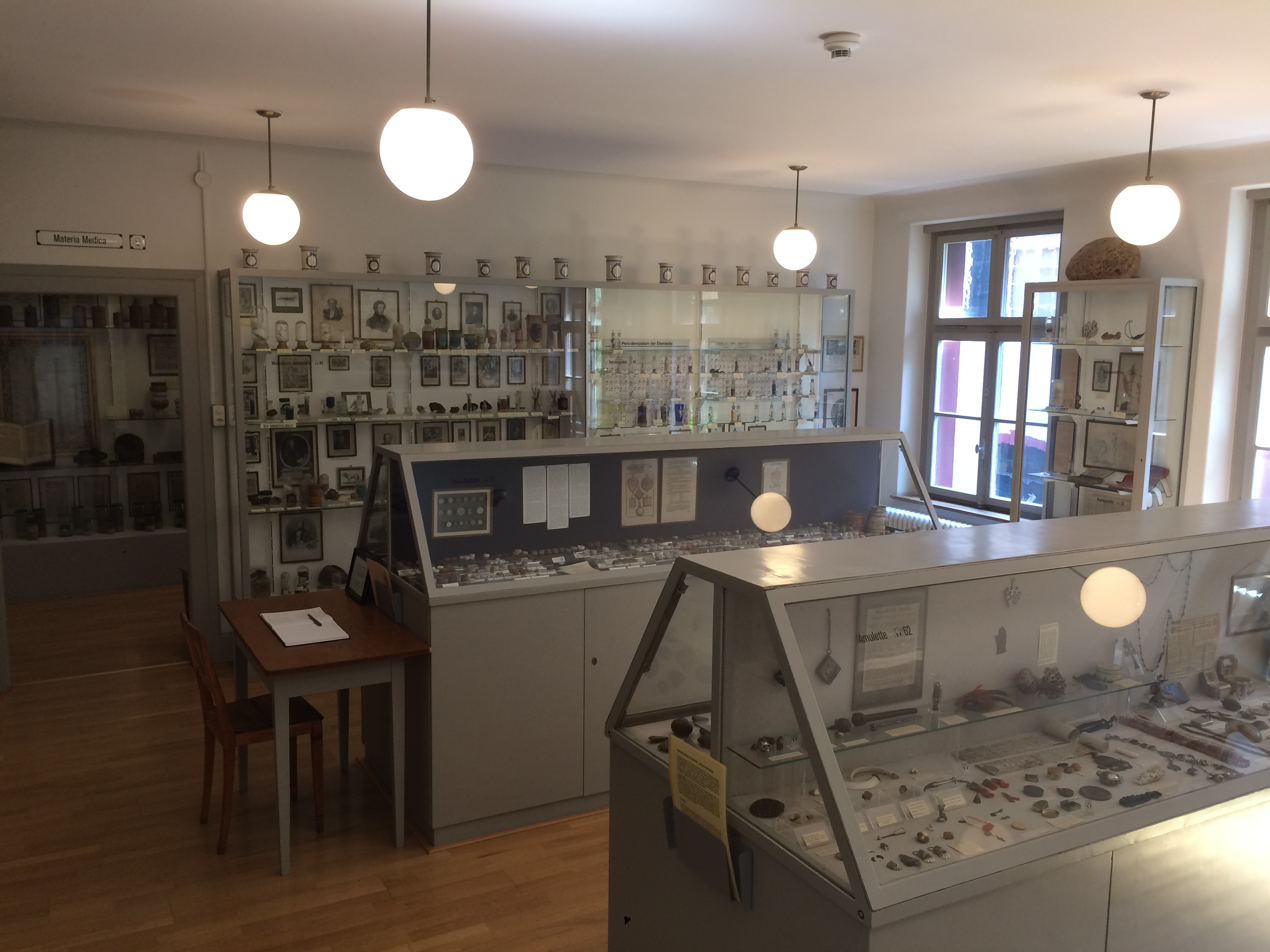
View of the exhibition room »Materia medica obsoleta«

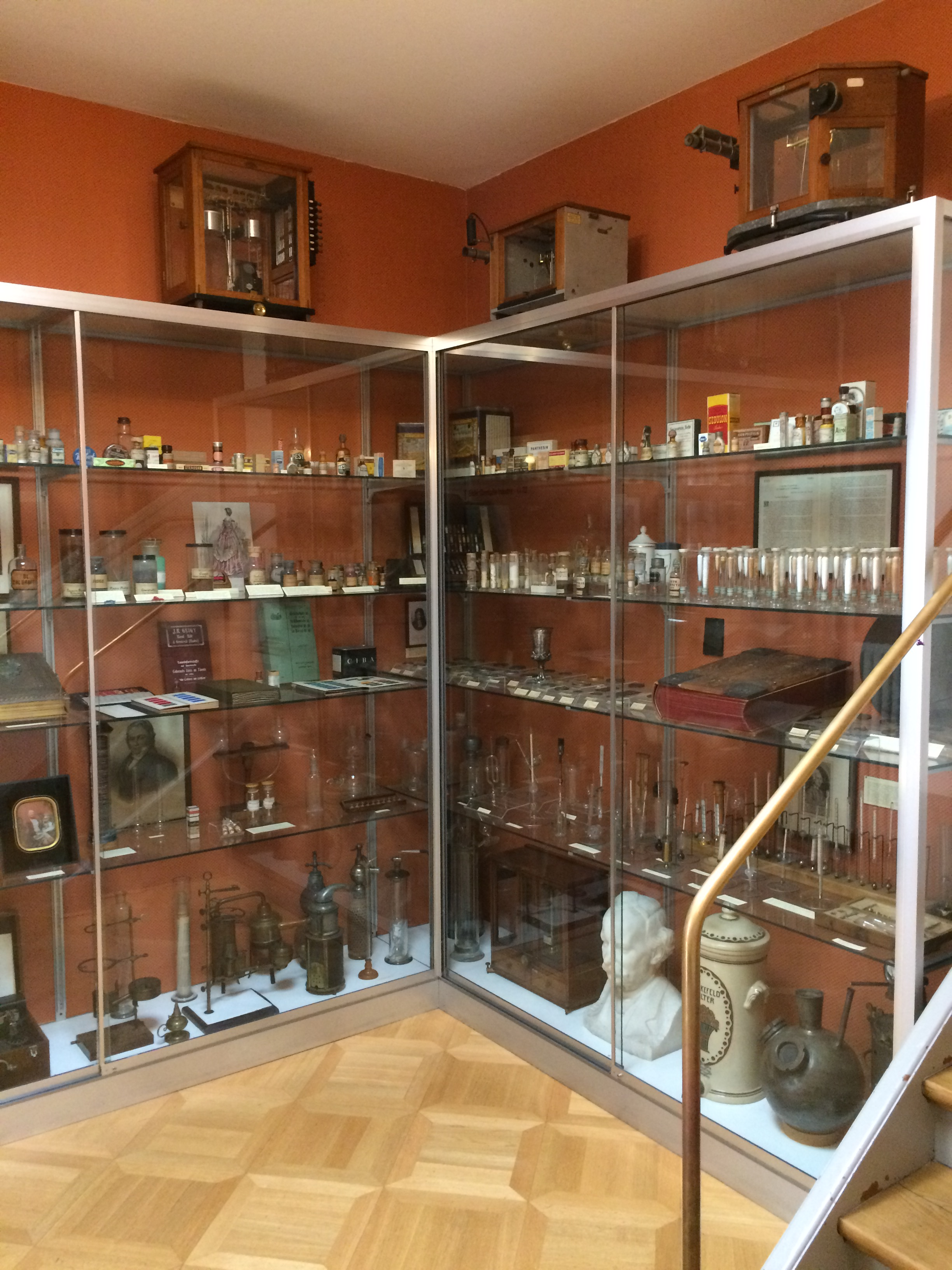
View of the exhibition room about the industrial history of the 19th century

Various aspects of diseases and illnesses, as well as various concepts of healing, are exemplified by a considerable collection of drugs and medications from all over the world.

=== Laboratories ===
Of the two historical laboratories in the collection, the alchemical laboratory with original exhibits from the 16th and 17th century testifies to the search for the philosopher's stone. The pharmaceutical laboratory dating from the time around 1800 was designed with the manual preparation of medicinal plants in mind.

=== Antique pharmacy interiors ===
Three antique pharmacy interiors illustrate the history of pharmacy through the ages: The luxuriantly decorated »Hofapotheke« (Court Pharmacy) from Innsbruck dates back to 1755. The pharmacy of the years around 1820 is designed in the classical style of the Empire. The transition to the industrial era is seen in the fixtures and fittings from the former Basel »Barfüsser-Apotheke« (Barfüsser Pharmacy), designed shortly before 1900. Today its interior functions as the museum shop and is located in the entrance to the museum.

=== Faience ===
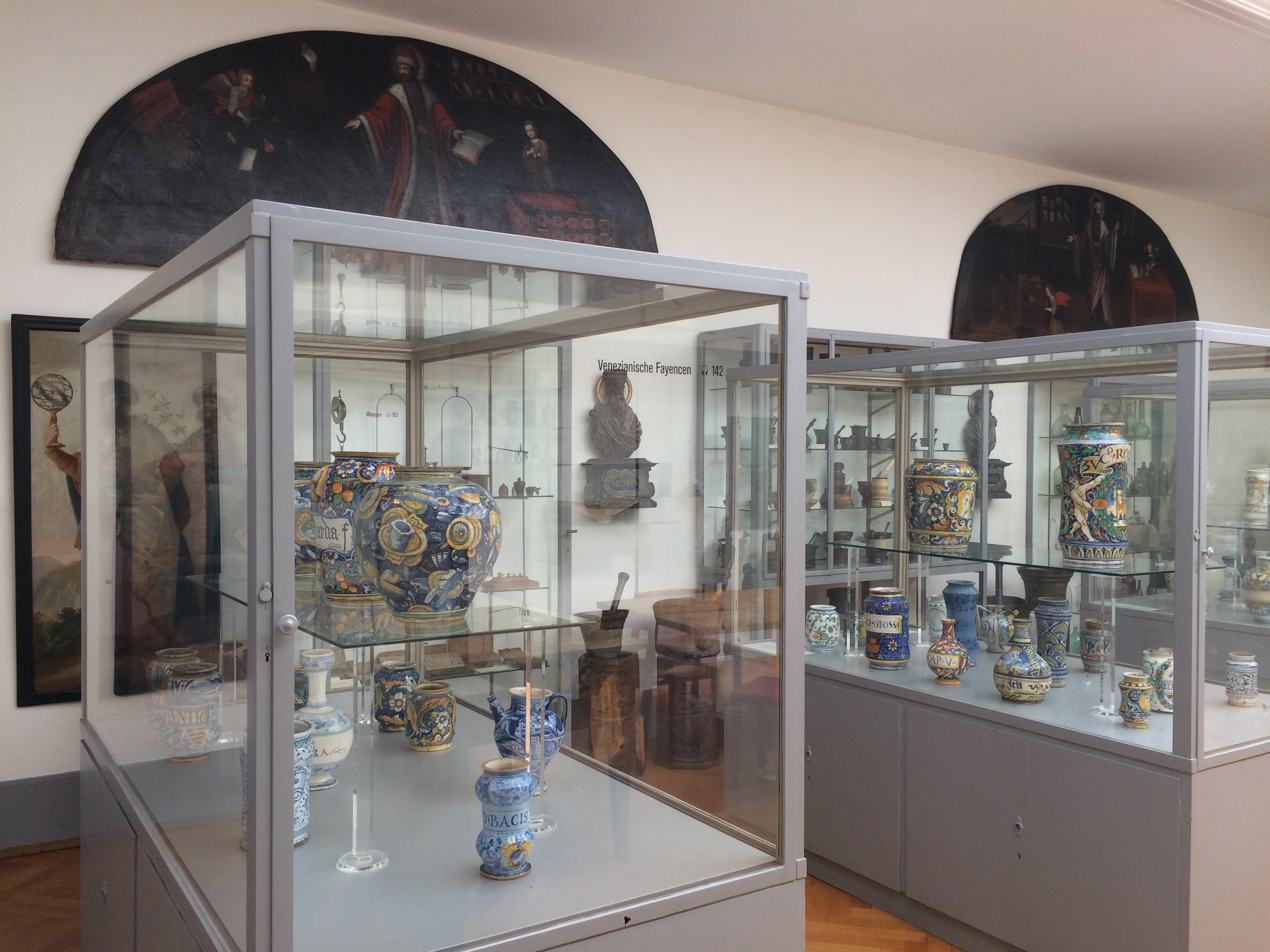
View of the pottery collection in the »Vasensaal«

The museum shows a prominent collection of pharmaceutical pottery. The so-called Faience have been used as containers for basic materials and remedies in pharmacies since the 15th century.

== Research ==
The Pharmacy Museum, as one of the two University Museums of Basel, is actively engaged in scientific research and teaching. There are courses in history of pharmacy, history of natural sciences and life sciences on a regular basis. Furthermore, the Pharmacy Museum promotes the scientific exploration of the history of pharmacy as well as research based on objects and collection.

== Library ==
The Pharmacy Museum is the home of a scientific library, containing literature and information about pharmacy, about its related sciences and about its history. Moreover, it contains material whose collection had not been originally intended, such as drug compendiums, advertising brochures, price and tariff lists and so forth). Books and goods from the library can not be lent out, they have to be viewed and used on location. The use of the library is free of charge.

== Museum Shop – Shopping like one hundred years ago ==
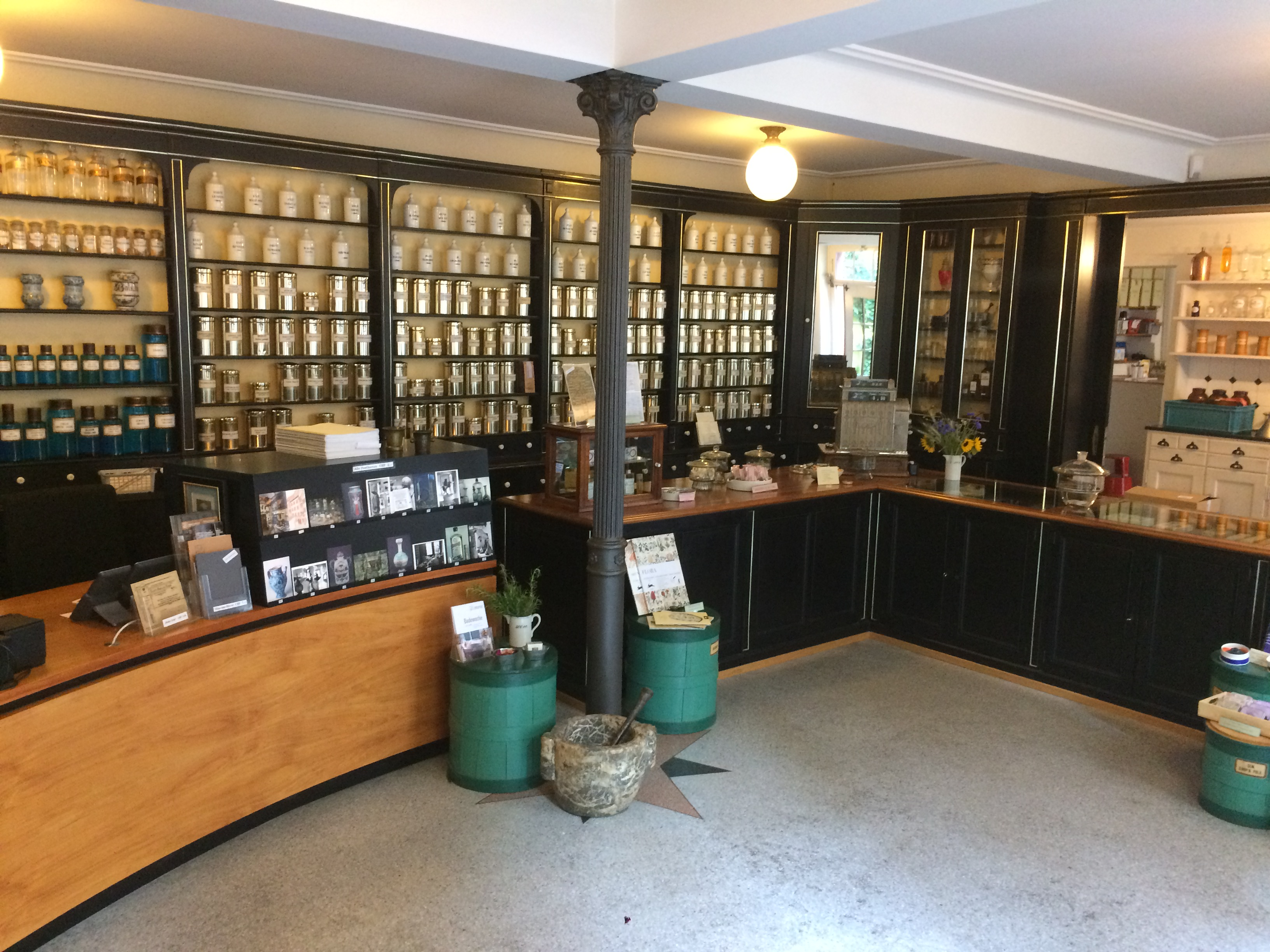
Museum shop

Original fittings from the city's 'Barfüsser-Apotheke' are now installed in the museum shop where visitors can choose from a selection of teas, herbs, confectionery, pharmaceutical glassware, soaps and other souvenirs. Entry to the museum shop is free of charge.

== Opening hours, Tickets and guided tours ==
The museum is open from Tuesday to Sunday, 10am - 5pm. The museum is closed on Mondays and public holidays.

The ticket for the museum is also valid in the Museum of Anatomy of the University of Basel on the same or the following day. Staff and students of the University of Basel have free admission to both museums.

There is a public guided tour of the museum on the first Sunday of every month at 2pm.

== See also ==
- Museums in Basel
- List of museums in Switzerland

== Literature (in German) ==
- Häfliger, Josef Anton: Pharmazeutische Altertumskunde und die Schweizerische Sammlung für historisches Apothekenwesen an der Universität Basel. Zurich 1931.
- Häfliger, Josef Anton: Das Apothekenwesen Basels. Basel 1938.
- Lutz, Alfons: Josef Anton Häfliger, der Begründer der pharmazeutischen Altertumskunde (1873-1954). In: Basler Jahrbuch 1956, S. 125–129.
- Lutz, Alfons, und Mez-Mangold, Lydia: Schweizerisches Pharmazie-Historisches Museum in Basel. Bern 1968 and 1974.
- Mez-Mangold Lydia: Aus der Geschichte des Medikaments. Basel 1972.
- Olonetzky, Beny, und Mez-Mangold, Lydia: Die Sammlung: Darstellung alter Arztinstrumente, Apotheker-Gefässe, Mikroskope, Einnehmelöffel, Terra sigillata, Amulette […]. Stuttgart 1980.
- Kessler, Michael, und Mez-Mangold, Lydia: Womit der Apotheker einst hantierte. Basel 1975 and 1990.
- Gugger, Beat, und Kessler, Michael: Revolution: Apothekerkunst und Industrieprozess. Basel 1996.
- Kessler, Michael, et al.: Strömung, Kraft und Nebenwirkung; Eine Geschichte der Basler Pharmazie. Basel 2002.
- Kessler, Michael, et al.: Leben am Totengässlein. Das Pharmazie-Historische Museum Basel im Haus "Zum Sessel". Basel 2002 and 2015.
- Kluge, Martin: Mit Kräutersud und Gottvertrauen. Basel 2008.

== In-house publications (in German) ==
- Kluge, Martin: Drachen in der Medizin. Reale Arznei aus irrealen Wesen. Exhibition catalogue; Basel 2005.
- Häner, Flavio, und Kessler, Michael: Lust, Leid und Wissen. Eine Geschichte der Syphilis und ihrer Therapie. Exhibition catalogue; Basel 2008
- Kluge, Martin: Mit Kräutersud und Gottvertrauen. Basel 2008.
- Mischke, Jürgen: Mumienharz und Schädelmoos. Der Mensch als Arzneimittel. Basel 2010.
- Valerius-Mahler, Christiane: Kickstart. Koffein im Blut. Exhibition catalogue; Basel 2012.
- Valerius-Mahler, Christiane: Strahlung. Die zwei Gesichter der Radioaktivität. Exhibition catalogue; Basel 2014.
- Kessler, Michael, et al.: Leben am Totengässlein. Das Pharmazie-Historische Museum Basel im Haus "Zum Sessel". Basel 2002 and 2015.
- Kessler, Michael: Zur Frage nach psychotropen Stoffen im Rauch von brennendem Gummiharz der Boswellia sacra. Inaugural dissertation, Basel 1989; new edition 2019.
