= Treatise on Heretics =

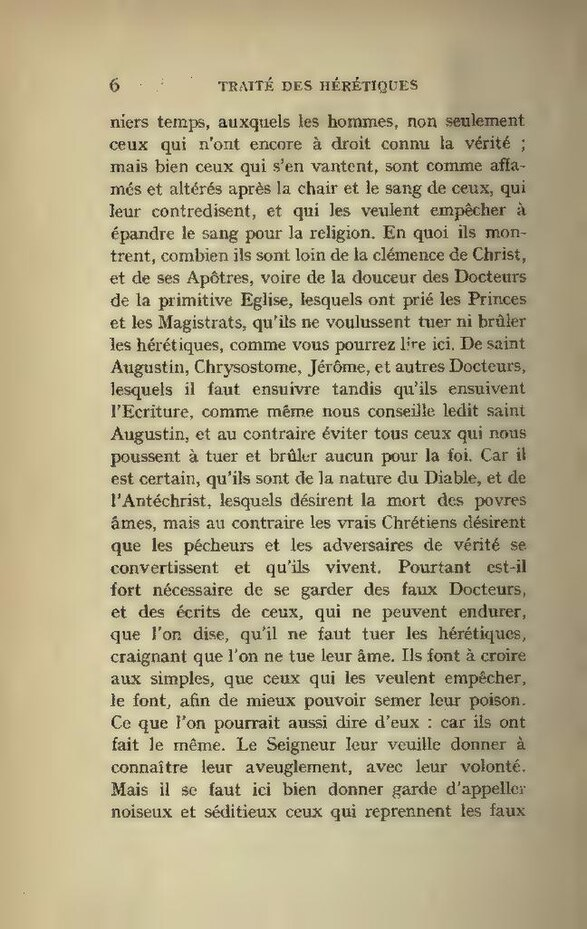
- Author: Sebastian Castellio
- Publication date: 1553

The Treatise on Heretics, in its full form the Treatise on Heretics: whether they should be persecuted, and how they should be treated according to the opinion and judgment of various authors, both ancient and modern (in Latin: De Haereticis, an sint persequendi et omnino quomodo sit cum eis agendum, doctorum virorum tum veterum, tum recentiorum sententiae), is a theological and patristic treatise written by Sebastian Castellio under the pseudonym Martin Bellie in 1553.

In this treatise, written in reaction to both the execution of Michael Servetus by John Calvin and the Catholic Inquisition, Castellio vehemently criticizes the concept of heresy and opposes the idea that political power should punish heretics. He defends freedom of conscience and religion, including for Jews and Muslims. Although his treatise, like Advice to a desolate France, did not succeed in preventing the French Wars of Religion, it stands as one of the earliest texts advocating for religious tolerance in history.

== History ==
=== Context ===
Castellio was a Protestant humanist theologian who initially worked in Strasbourg before moving to Geneva to assist John Calvin. Quickly disillusioned by the nascent theocracy, he grew increasingly critical of Calvin. This opposition reached its peak with the execution of Michael Servetus, a Christian theologian deemed heterodox, who was burned alive in Geneva.

Castellio, who had taken refuge in Basel, embarked on writing against Calvin.

=== Composition ===
The text is composed of various pieces. It is an anthology gathering opinions from Christian authors opposed to the death penalty or judicial prosecutions for heresy. Most of the sources Castellio used were from patristic authors such as Jerome, John Chrysostom, Lactantius, and Augustine, but he also included contemporary authors like Erasmus, Luther, and, ironically, Calvin and Castellio himself. Castellio translated the text and published it in French and Latin, and quickly released a German translation as well. Besides this Swiss context, he seems to have been inspired by issues related to the Anabaptists in Germany, the situation surrounding David Joris, and writings by authors like Sebastian Franck.

The pamphlet had a significant impact in Geneva, prompting Theodore Beza to respond the following year with his own treatise defending the execution of Servetus.

== Analysis ==
=== Theses Defended ===
The author advocated for consistent religious tolerance and complete impunity for heretics. Castellio's defense extended beyond heterodox Christians to include religious tolerance for Jews and Muslims, whom he referred to as "Turks".

=== Legacy ===
Jacopo Aconcio and Baruch Spinoza are believed to have read the treatise and been inspired by it. The text is considered one of the earliest defenses of religious tolerance in history. It appears to have had a lasting influence on the history of French Protestantism.

In 1936, Stefan Zweig published A Conscience Against Violence, a biography of Castellio, paying tribute to him. The text is considered one of the most important literary works on religious tolerance.
