= Paul-Alexis Mellet =

French historian

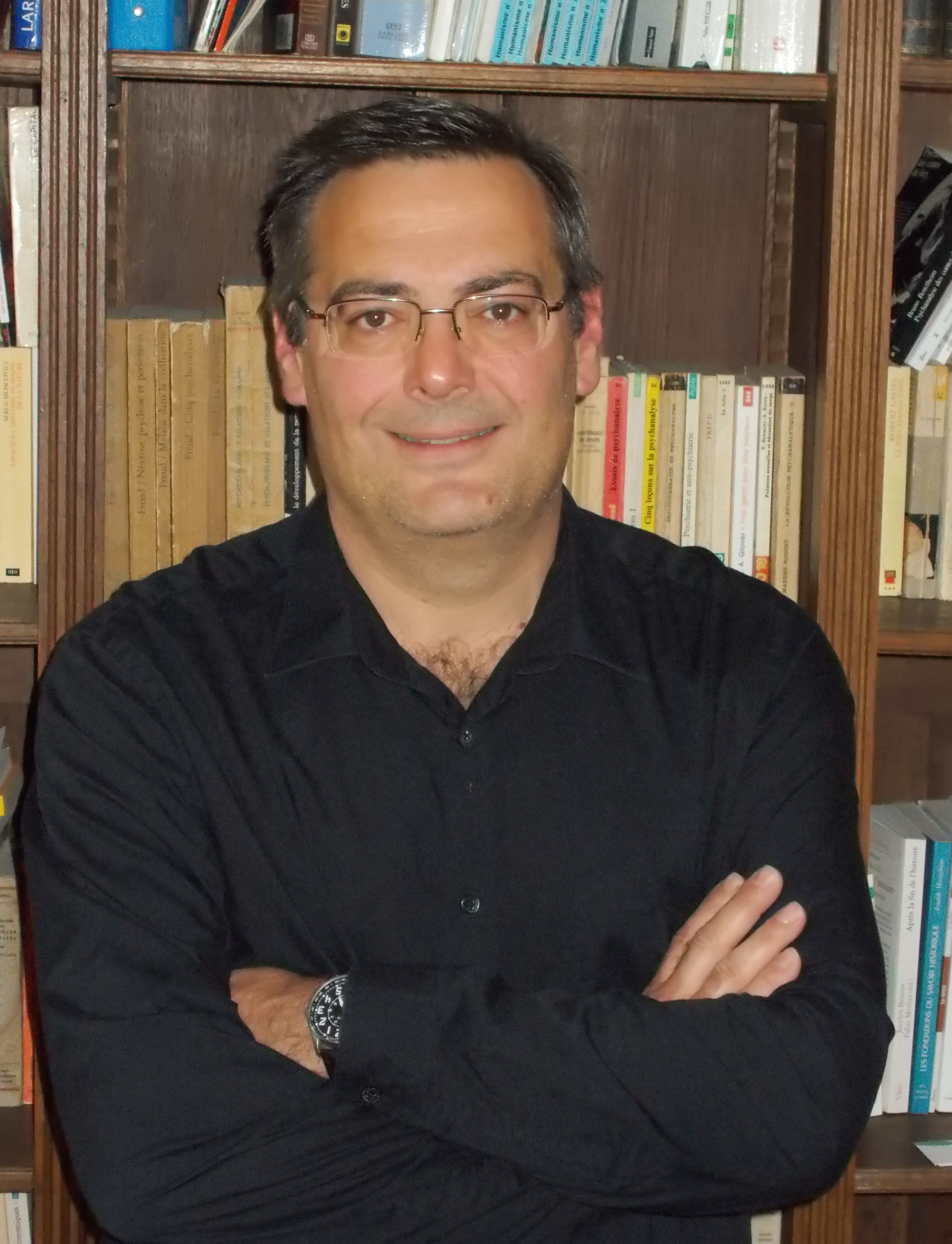
- Paul-Alexis Mellet in 2015
- Born: 1970 (age 55–56); 14th arrondissement of Paris
- Organization: Comité de vigilance face aux usages publics de l'histoire Association des historiens modernistes des universités françaises
- Title: Historian

Paul-Alexis Mellet is a French early modern historian and expert in the political and religious ideas from early modernity. He is a professor at the University of Geneva (College of Letters) and a member of the Institute of Reformation History. Formerly, he was a professor at the University of Cergy-Pontoise, and at the University of Tours (Center for Advanced Renaissance Studies).

His specializations include the history of political ideas and the history of religious practices of the sixteenth century, notably inter-confessional exchanges, methods of territorial domination, avec Florence Alazard, "Pouvoirs symboliques des États : souveraineté, territoire, empire", dans F. Alazard, L. Gerbier et P.-A. Mellet (dir.), Empire et domination territoriale, actes de la journée d'étude de Tours (mai 2010), Astérion. Philosophie, histoire des idées, pensée politique, Lyon, No. 10, 2012, disinformation techniques during times of war, tensions stemming from diversities of opinion, constructions of religious identities and conversions, "remonstrances" printed in Europe, Biblical interpretations, Royal entries, regicides, and oaths.

== Biography ==
After completing his studies in philosophy (Paris-Sorbonne) and history (Panthéon-Sorbonne), Mellet passed his "aggregation" in history and devoted his thesis to Protestant Monarchomachs under the direction of Gérald Chaix (l'université de Tours/CESR, 2004). His habilitation concerned the "remonstrances" printed in France between 1550 and 1600 and was completed under the direction of Denis Crouzet (Paris-Sorbonne, 2017). Mellet was awarded several research grants, allowing him to study in Geneva (BGE/IHR), Brussels (Bibliothèque Royale de Belgique), Wolfenbüttel (Bibliotheca Augusta), Chicago (Newberry Library) and Madison (Institute for Research in the Humanities).

== Research ==
Mellet focuses on the history of Protestant reforms and the history of political ideas, notably perceptions of authorities during the Modern era (end of 15th c. to beginning of 16th c.) and the varying degrees of resistance or acceptance that they were met with. He is also interested in the history of books and the history of European wars in France, Switzerland, Germany, Savoy, the Netherlands, and England.

Around these themes, he has published ten books, organized some 30 academic trips and symposiums and given over 80 papers and lectures in Europe and the United States. He has contributed to a number of publications on modern European history and taken part in several scientific popularization projects for the general public (television and radio segments, public lectures, etc.). He regularly contributes to a number of French reviews (RHMC, BSHPF, RHR, CRMH, etc.) and international reviews (Bibliothèque d'Humanisme et Renaissance, Archiv für Reformationsgeschichte, Church History and Religious Culture, Sixteenth Century Journal). At the CESR, he co-directed two collections with the publishers Champion (Savoir de Mantice) and Garnier (Travaux du CESR). He has published the majority of his works with Droz (Geneva).

=== Monarchomachs ===
With the study of French-speaking Protestant Monarchomachs (French Huguenot theorists who opposed monarchy, known in particular for having theoretically justified tyrannicide), Mellet is interested in undertakings starting in 1560 that aimed to oppose the tightening of religious policy in France, Switzerland, and the Netherlands. In particular, he has showed that the term Monarchomachs, coined in 1600 by the jurist William Barclay in order to collectively denounce Calvinists and members of the Catholic League who were, according to him, opposed to monarchy, ought to be decoupled from its etymology and initial context and adapted to fit five criteria: legitimate resistance, rejection of tyranny, double alliance (between God, the people and the king), conditional obedience, and the sovereignty of the people (through their representatives). With these criteria, it is possible to create a list of ten "Protestant Monarchomach" texts, of which the most well-known are François Hotman's Francogallia (1573), Théodore de Bèze's Droit des magistrats sur leurs sujets (1574), Jean de Coras' Question politique (1569) and Réveille-matin des François (1574). There are also the less celebrated treatises, such as Remonstrance aus seigneurs gentilshommes (1574), Discours politiques des diverses puissances establies de Dieu au monde (1576), Question, assavoir s'il est licite sauver la vie aux massacreurs (1573), and Questions, assavoir s'il est loisible aux sujets de se deffendre contre le Magistrat (1573). Once Barclay's restrictive definition is shed, we can not only study the conceptual foundation of these works from the point of view of their system of historical references (Saint Thomas, Grégoire de Tours, etc.) and biblical references (1 Samuel 8, Romains 13,1), but also measure their spread throughout Europe (Frankfurt Book Fair, public and private library catalogs).

=== Remonstrances ===
Another dimension of Mellet's research consists of the study of remonstrances printed in Europe between 1550 and 1650. Despite appearing suddenly and multiplying rapidly during periods of religious tension and civil war (in France, Switzerland, the Netherlands, Empire, England, and Savoy), reaching 700 publications between 1560 and 1600 in France alone, these texts of circumstance had not been the object of any specific study until now. In contrast with Monarchomachian treatises, remonstrances are more situated in an institutional framework (particularly in the case for parliamentary remonstrances) and constitute an opposition of lower intensity. They are primarily intended to address the prince, along with his council and religious authorities, and to peacefully temper a given decision or edict. In return, the prince can address a remonstrance to his people to return order (Remonstrance aux habitants de Marseille, qu'il n'y a rien de plus profitable que de se conserver souz l'obeyssance de leurs Roys naturels, Lyon, Thomas Soubron, 1597). Only certain remonstrances take on a rhetoric of invective, like the remonstrances of the Catholic League after 1588. The other texts are characterized by lamentations of the present and adopt the rhetoric of "the miseries of the time" (Remonstrance a la Royne mere du Roy, par ceux qui sont persecutez pour la parole de Dieu, s.l., 1561). Remonstrance, in reality, reinforces the position of power which it addresses, thanks to various processes of humility and exhortations to, for instance, modify the religious legislation under Philippe II in the Netherlands or to force the adoption of decrees of the Council of Trent in France. Above all, remonstrances provide the opportunity to see political and religious conflicts from the perspective of the day, demonstrating that, despite the tension, violence, and wars, some spaces of negotiation subsisted that were actively conserved by certain actors. The civil wars of the 15th and 16th centuries were not periods during which all dialogue was cast aside, specifically between Catholics and Protestants; to the contrary, remonstrances maintained spaces of exchange and negotiation within armed conflict.

He has also created an international research group on "The remonstrances of the Ancien Régime (15th-18th c.)" with Ullrich Langer (University of Wisconsin-Madison). This team of 30 European and American researchers studies remonstrances in a multidisciplinary fashion across law, literature, history, philosophy, rhetoric, theology, and political science. They have gathered several times since 2011, notably in Tours, Paris, Chicago, and Wolfenbüttel. An overview of these works is underway at Garnier with anticipated publication in 2020.

== Selected publications ==
=== Books ===
- Et de sa bouche sortait un glaive. Les Monarchomaques au xvi^{e}, actes du colloque de Tours (mai 2003), Genève, Droz, 2006, 192 pages.
- Les Traités Monarchomaques. Confusion des temps, résistance armée et monarchie parfaite (vers 1560-vers 1600), Genève Droz, 2007, 584 p.
- with Florence Alazard and Laurent Gerbier (dir.), Empire et domination territoriale, in Astérion. Philosophie, histoire des idées, pensée politique, ENS Lyon, 2012.
- with Jérémie Foa (dir.), Le Bruit des armes. Mises en formes et désinformations en Europe au temps des guerres de Religion (1560–1610), actes du colloque de Tours (novembre 2009), Paris, Honoré Champion, 2012, 430 p.
- with Annie Duprat and Claire Soussen (ed.), Bon gré mal gré: les échanges interconfessionnels dans l'Occident chrétien (XII^{e}-XVIII^{e} siècles), in Cahiers de recherches médiévales et humanistes, Orléans, 24, 2012, p. 155-320.
- with Elise Boillet and Sonia Cavicchioli (ed.), Les figures de David à la Renaissance, Geneva, Droz, 2014, 549 p.
- with Florence Alazard, Laurent Gerbier and Stephan Geonget (ed.), Dissensus. Pratiques et représentations de la diversité des opinions (1500–1650), Paris, Honoré Champion, 2016, 256 p.
- with Jean-Raymond Fanlo and Marino Lambiase (ed.), critical edition of Eusèbe Philadelphe Cosmopolite, Le Reveille-matin des François et de leurs voisins (1574), Paris, Garnier, 2016, 561 p.
- with Florence Alazard, Laurent Gerbier, Stephan Geonget and Romain Ménini (ed.), critical edition of Conseil à la France désolée de Sébastien Castellion, Geneva, Droz, 2017, 167-287 p.
- with Odette Turias, critical edition of Histoire de France de La Popelinière (1581), livres VII (P.-A. Mellet) et VIII (O. Turias), Geneva, Droz, 2019, 567 p.
