= Advice to a desolate France =

1562 pamphlet by Sebastian Castellio

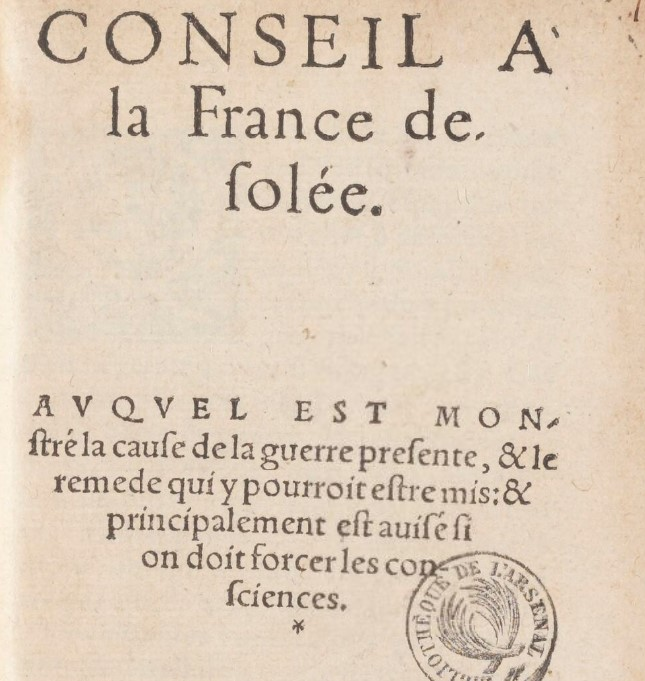
- Author: Sebastian Castellio
- Publication date: 1562

Advice to a desolate France, in full Advice to a desolate France, in which the cause of the present war and the remedy that could be applied are shown, and primarily advises whether one should force consciences, (in French: Conseil à la France désolée, auquel est monstré la cause de la guerre présente et le remède qui y pourroit estre mis, et principalement est avisé si on doit forcer les consciences) is a pamphlet published anonymously by Sebastian Castellio in 1562.

The text, published on the beginning of the First French War of Religion, opposes religious intolerance and proposes a common path to peace for Protestants and Catholics based on religious tolerance. Although the work, like the Treatise on Heretics, did not succeed in preventing the French Wars of Religion, it remains one of the earliest texts to defend religious freedom in the modern era.

== History ==
=== Context ===
Castellio was a Protestant humanist theologian; he lived in Strasbourg and then moved to Geneva to assist John Calvin. Quickly disillusioned by the young theocracy, he became increasingly critical of the preacher. This opposition reached its peak with the execution of Michael Servetus, a Protestant theologian perceived as heterodox, who was burned at the stake in Geneva.

Castellio, who was a refugee in Basel, undertook to write against Calvin. In 1553, he published the Treatise on Heretics, in which he opposed the theology underpinning the persecutions against heretics.

=== Writing ===
The pamphlet was written by Castellio in 1562, shortly before his death, and published anonymously in Basel. It is approximately 20,000 words long. At the time, the text was very poorly received among both Protestant and Catholic communities, with Protestants accusing him of treason and Catholics of heresy. Unlike the Protestant critics, notably the attacks by Theodore Beza, Castellio did not seem to ignore the situation of the Protestants in France, as he was in direct contact with Protestant refugees.

== Analysis ==
=== Defended Theses ===
The central aspect of the work aimed to address both Protestants and Catholics, criticized the violence between the two parties, and called for a return to "reason". Castellio developed the idea of the peaceful coexistence of religions. Unlike the Treatise on Heretics, which primarily targeted John Calvin, here the author refocused and also attacked the fanaticism displayed by some Catholics. For him, the origin of the Wars of Religion lied in religious intolerance. Castellio used the biblical figure of Ananias to target his opponents, associating them with this figure perceived as hypocritical and false. By using a biblical narrative, that of Susanna, the theologian drew a parallel between rape and forcing someone to change their religion.

=== Legacy ===
The pamphlet is considered one of the earliest texts defending religious freedom in the modern era. The text gained particular significance and was reused within Protestantism by the Remonstrants in their controversies.

In 1936, Stefan Zweig published Conscience Against Violence, a biography of Castellio, in which he paid tribute to him.
