= Gertrude Lachner =

Swiss humanist

- Died: 1559
- Spouse(s): Johann Froben, Johann Herwagen

Gertrude Lachner, also known as Froben or Herwagen, (d. circa 1559–1560 in Basel) was a Swiss humanist and publisher close to Erasmus. Initially the wife of Johann Froben and later of Johann Herwagen, she was actively involved in their publishing work.

Her remarriage to Herwagen, after the death of her first husband, significantly increased the quantity and quality of their productions until 1538, when Herwagen had an affair with Katherina Weckart, the wife of his stepson Erasmus Froben. This affair divided their family and publishing house.

== Biography ==
She was born on an unknown date, her father was Wolfgang Lachner and was also a printer and a librarian. She initially married Johann Froben. In 1515, their son, Erasmus Froben, became the godson of Erasmus. After Froben's death, she married Johann Herwagen around 1528, with whom she was already collaborating and who was close to her late husband. This allowed them to merge their presses and increase the frequency, quantity, and quality of their productions, now bearing both names, Froben-Herwagen.

Despite Lachner and Herwagen's friendship with Erasmus, the couple had conflicts with the humanist in the late 1520s regarding Erasmus Froben's education, as they did not wish to follow the Dutchman's advice for him to study at the University of Louvain instead of remaining in Switzerland or going to Lyon. Despite their serious conflicts, the humanist continued to use their presses, likely out of friendship for Lachner rather than for Herwagen.

In 1538, the family was scandalized after Herwagen seduced Katherina Weckart, the wife of Erasmus Froben, who left him. He had to face a trial and was sentenced in 1542 to a heavy fine and exile. Although he continued his activities and managed to return to Basel, this significantly slowed down his publishing endeavors and caused lasting divisions within the family.

She died around 1559–1560.
