= Johann Herwagen =

Swiss Protestant publisher (1497–1558)

- Born: c. 1497; Hegau
- Died: c. 1557-1558; Basel
- Occupation: Printer
- Years active: 1520-1558

Signature
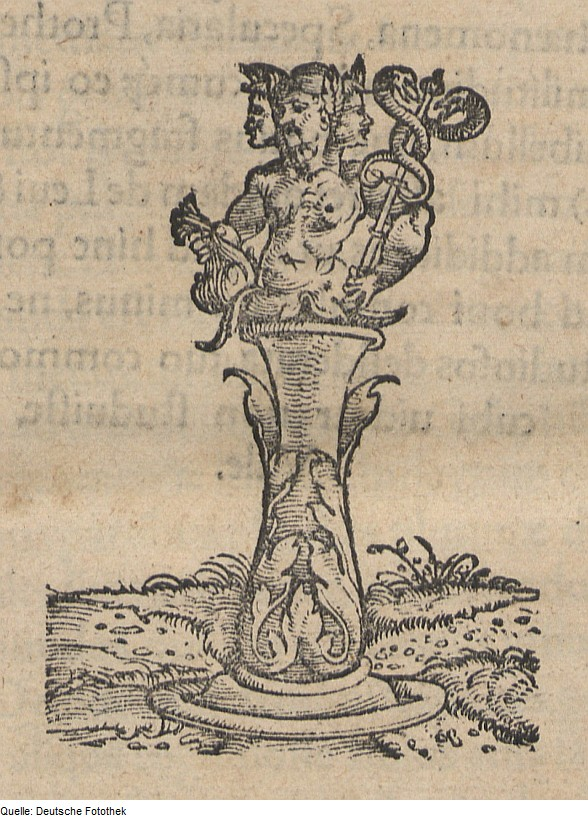

Johann Herwagen or Johann Herwagen the Elder, known as Hervagius (1497 in Hegau - 1557–1558 in Basel) was a Swiss Protestant publisher.

In contact with numerous European intellectuals, he was actively involved and made his mark in the dissemination and propagation of early ideas of the Reformation and the Renaissance.

== Biography ==
He was born in 1497 in Hegau. He was one of the first Protestant publishers, and he edited Luther's texts in the 1520s. He stayed in Strasbourg from 1523 to 1528. The publisher was very close to Johann Froben, and both were significant in the spread of Renaissance and Reformation ideas. In 1526, shortly after his death, he married his widow, Gertrude Lachner. His good knowledge of Greek and Latin allowed him to intervene directly and be consulted in case of printing disputes. During his lifetime, he was recognized as an important publisher and was nicknamed by his Latin name, Hervagius. He was relatively close to Erasmus, among others, and Erasmus declared about him that he 'was a man of good faith and not unlearned'.

Despite Lachner and Herwagen's friendship with Erasmus, the couple had conflicts with the humanist in the late 1520s regarding Erasmus Froben's education, as they did not wish to follow the Dutchman's advice for him to study at the University of Louvain instead of remaining in Switzerland or going to Lyon. Despite their serious conflicts, the humanist continued to use their presses, likely out of friendship for Lachner rather than for Herwagen.

In addition to Luther's texts, he published other Protestant works as well as a variety of other works, such as the Iliad and the Odyssey, Bede or mathematical treatises. The Swiss printer established editorial connections with François Rabelais and Sebastian Castellio, publishing the Castellio Bible in 1555. Herwagen also had an interest in patristics and was one of the first publishers to print the Greek texts of certain Church Fathers, such as John Chrysostom. In 1538, he was involved in scandal after seducing Katherina Weckart, the wife of his stepson Erasmus Forben, who left him. He had to face a trial and was sentenced in 1542 to a heavy fine and exile. Although he continued his activities and managed to return to Basel, this significantly slowed down his publishing endeavors.

He died around 1557-1558 and his wife, Gertrude Herwagen née Lachner, died the following year.

He was the father of Johann Herwagen the Younger, who continued his works until his death in 1564.
