= Ambrosius Frobenius =

Swiss book publisher

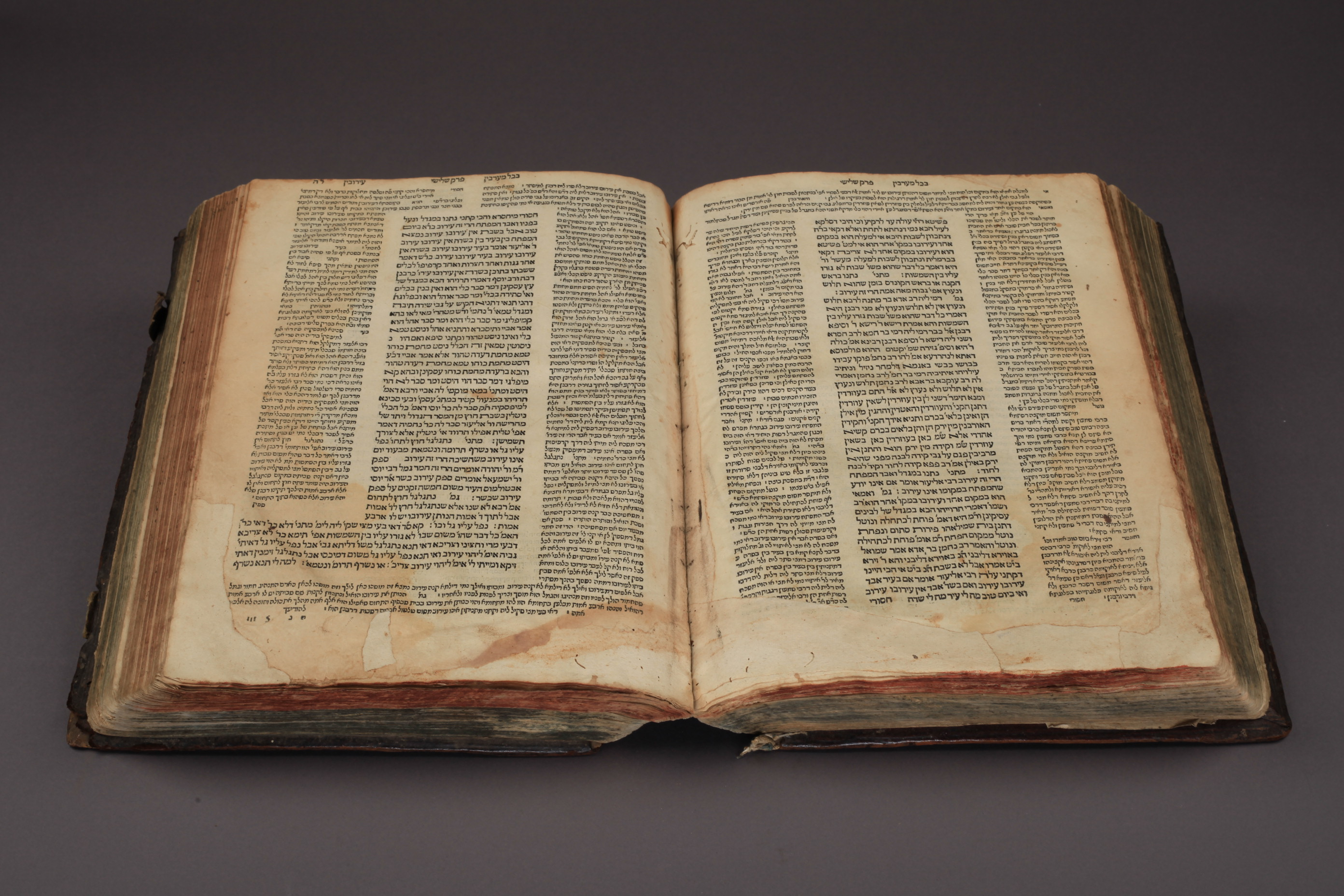
The Talmud on display in the Jewish Museum of Switzerland brings together parts from the first two Talmud prints by Daniel Bomberg and Ambrosius Froben.

Ambrosius Froben, or Frobenius in Latin (1537–1602), was a Basel printer, and the publisher of an almost complete Hebrew Talmud, between 1578 and 1580. He was son of Hieronymus Froben (1501–1565), and grandson of Johann Froben (1460–1527), the Swiss scholar and printer.
