= Sebastian Castellio =

French theologian (1515–1563)

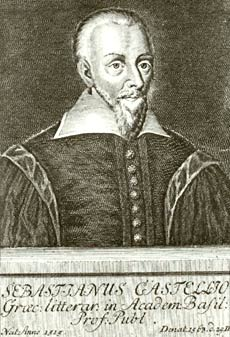
- Born: 1515; Saint-Martin-du-Frêne, Duchy of Savoy
- Died: 29 December 1563 (aged 47–48); Basel, Swiss Confederation
- Occupations: Preacher, professor, theologian, translator
- Notable work: De haereticis, an sint persequendi
- Theological work
- Notable ideas: Freedom of religion

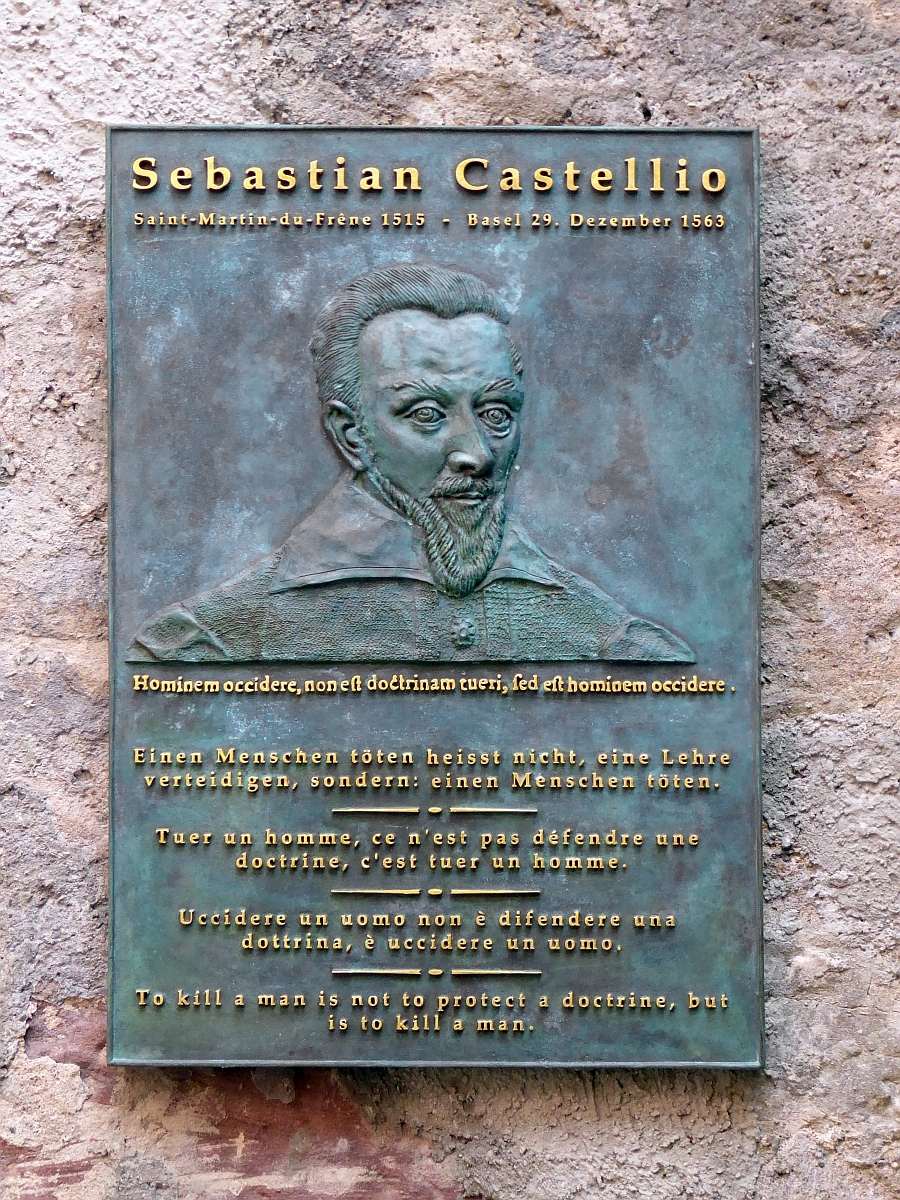
Commemorative plaque in Basel

Sebastian Castellio (also Sébastien Châteillon, Châtaillon, Castellión, and Castello; 1515 – 29 December 1563) was a French preacher and theologian; and one of the first Reformed Christian proponents of religious toleration, freedom of conscience and thought.

== Introduction ==
Castellio was born in 1515 in the village of Saint-Martin-du-Frêne. Having been educated at the age of twenty at the University of Lyon, Castellio became an expert in Latin, Hebrew and Greek. Two hundred years later, Voltaire wrote: "We can measure the virulence of this tyranny by the persecution to which Castellio was exposed at Calvin's instance — although Castellio was a far greater scholar than Calvin, whose jealousy drove him out of Geneva."

Castellio later wrote that he was deeply affected and moved when he saw the burning of heretics in Lyon by the French Inquisition, and at the age of twenty-four he decided to subscribe to the teachings of the Reformation. In the spring of 1540, after witnessing the killings of the early Protestant martyrs, he left Lyon and became a missionary for Protestantism.

== Early career ==
In 1543, after the plague struck Geneva, Sebastian Castellio was one of the only divines in Geneva to visit the sick and console the dying. Though Calvin himself did visit the sick, others among the Genevan ministers did not.

For his outstanding work, the Geneva City Council recommended Castellio's permanent appointment as preacher in Vandoeuvres; however, in 1544, a campaign against him was initiated by Calvin. At the time, Castellio decided to translate the Bible into his native French, and was very excited to ask for an endorsement from his friend Calvin, but Calvin's endorsement was already given to his cousin Pierre Olivetan's French translation of the Bible, so Castellio was rebuked and turned down. Calvin wrote to a friend regarding the matter: "Just listen to Sebastian's preposterous scheme, which makes me smile, and at the same time angers me. Three days ago he called on me, to ask permission for the publication of his translation of the New Testament."

Castellio and Calvin's disagreements grew even wider when, during a public meeting, Castellio rose to his feet and claimed that clergy should stop persecuting those who disagree with them on matters of Biblical interpretation, and should be held to the same standards that all other believers were held to. Soon after, Calvin charged Castellio with the offence of "undermining the prestige of the clergy". Castellio was forced to resign from his position of Rector and asked to be dismissed from being a preacher in Vandoeuvres. Anticipating future attacks from Calvin, Castellio asked for a signed letter that outlined in detail the reasons for his departure: "That no one may form a false idea of the reasons for the departure of Sebastian Castellio, we all declare that he has voluntarily resigned his position as rector at the College, and up till now performed his duties in such a way that we regarded him worthy to become one of our preachers. If, in the end, the affair was not thus arranged, this is not because any fault has been found in Castellio's conduct, but merely for the reasons previously indicated."

== Years of poverty ==
The man who once was the Rector in Geneva was now homeless and in deep poverty. The next few years were desperate times for him. Though one of the most learned men of his time, his life came down to begging for food from door to door. Living in abject poverty with his eight dependents, Castellio was forced to depend on strangers to stay alive. His plight brought sympathy and admiration from his contemporaries. Montaigne wrote "it was deplorable that a man who had done such good service as Castellio should have fallen upon evil days" and added that "many persons would unquestionably have been glad to help Castellio had they known soon enough that he was in want".

History indicates that many perhaps were afraid to help Castellio for fear of reprisals from Geneva. Castellio's existence ranged from begging and digging ditches for food to proof-reading for the Basel printshop of Johannes Oporinus. He also worked as a private tutor while translating thousands of pages from Greek, Hebrew and Latin into French and German. He was also the designated successor to Desiderius Erasmus in continuing his work of the reconciliation of Christianity in the Protestant, Anabaptist, and Catholic branches, and prophetically predicted the French Wars of Religion, and potentially the destruction of Christianity in Europe, if Christians could not learn to tolerate and reach each other by love and reason rather than by force of arms, and in short become real followers of Christ, rather than of bitter, partisan, and sectarian ideologies. His writings were widely circulated in manuscript form for a time, but were later forgotten. John Locke desired their publication, but at that time it was a capital crime to even own copies of manuscripts by Castellio or on the Servetus controversy, so Locke's friends convinced him to publish the same ideas under his own name. These writings were remembered by foundational theologians and historians such as Gottfried Arnold, Pierre Bayle, Johann Lorenz von Mosheim, Johann Jakob Wettstein, and Roger Williams.

In 1551, his translation of the Bible into Latin was published; in 1555 his French translation of the Bible was published.

== Conflict with Calvin ==
Castellio's fortunes gradually improved, and in August 1553, he was made a Master of Arts of the University of Basel and appointed to a prestigious teaching position. However, in October 1553, the physician and theologian Michael Servetus was executed in Geneva for blasphemy and heresy – in particular, his repudiation of the doctrine of the Trinity. Many prominent Protestant leaders of the day approved of the execution, and Melanchthon wrote to Calvin: "To you also the Church owes gratitude at the present moment, and will owe it to the latest posterity. [...] I affirm also that your magistrates did right in punishing, after a regular trial, this blasphemous man." However, many other contemporary scholars, such as David Joris and Bernardino Ochino (also known as the remonstrators) were outraged both publicly and privately over the execution of Servetus. The synods of Zürich and Schaffhausen were far from enthusiastic, and Castellio took an especially hard line regarding the whole affair. He became enraged over what he saw as a blatant murder committed by Calvin, and spoke of his "hands dripping with the blood of Servetus."

As a defence of his actions, in February 1554 Calvin published a treatise titled Defence of the orthodox faith in the sacred Trinity (Defensio orthodoxae fidei de sacra Trinitate) in which he presented arguments in favour of the execution of Servetus for diverging from orthodox Christian doctrine.

Three months later, Castellio wrote (as Basil Montfort) a large part of the pamphlet Treatise on Heretics (De haereticis, an sint persequendi) with the place of publication being given on the first page as Magdeburg rather than Basel. The book was financed by the wealthy Italian Bernardino Bonifazio, was published under the pseudonym Martinus Bellius, and was printed by Johannes Oporinus, a known Basel book printer. It is believed that the pamphlet was co-authored by Laelius Socinus and Celio Secondo Curione. Concerning the execution of Servetus, Castellio wrote: "When Servetus fought with reasons and writings, he should have been repulsed by reasons and writings." He invoked the testimony of Church Fathers like Augustine, Chrysostom and Jerome to support freedom of thought, and even used Calvin's own words, written back when he was himself being persecuted by the Catholic Church: "It is unchristian to use arms against those who have been expelled from the Church, and to deny them rights common to all mankind." Asking who is a heretic, he concluded, "I can find no other criterion than that we are all heretics in the eyes of those who do not share our views."

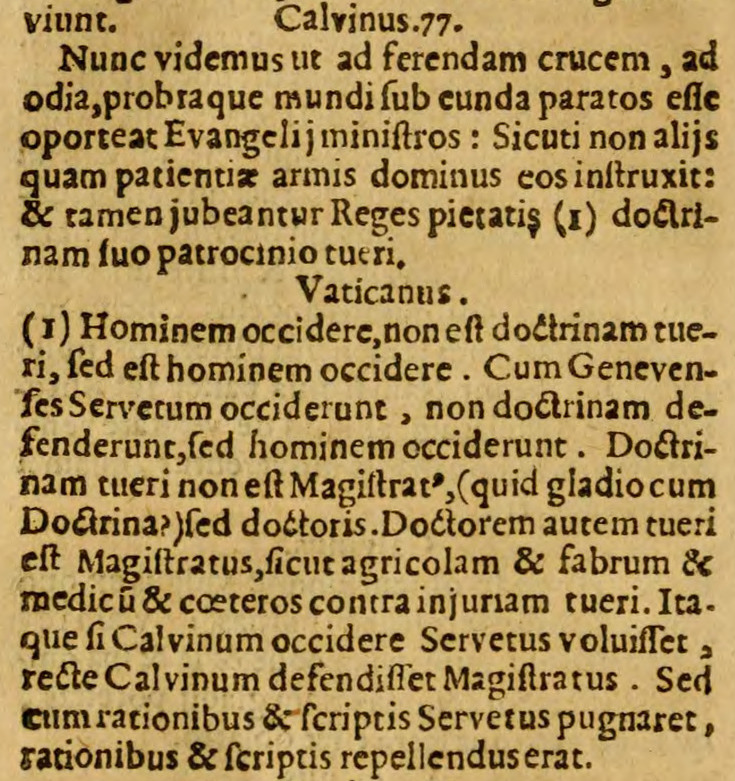
Page of Castellio's Against Calvin's Booklet in which he states: "Hominem occidere, non est doctrinam tueri, sed hominem occidere." ("To kill a man is not to protect a doctrine, it is to kill a man.")

Marius Valkhoff describes Castellio's Advice to a desolate France as a pacifist manifesto.

Castellio can also be credited with a huge advance in the promotion of the concept of limited government. He passionately argued for separation of church and state and against the idea of theocracy. Arguing that no one is entitled to direct and control another's thought, he stated that authorities should have "no concern with matters of opinion" and concluded: "We can live together peacefully only when we control our intolerance. Even though there will always be differences of opinion from time to time, we can at any rate come to general understandings, can love one another, and can enter the bonds of peace, pending the day when we shall attain unity of faith."

== Death ==
Castellio died in Basel in 1563 and was buried in the tomb of a noble family. His enemies unearthed the body, burned it, and scattered the ashes. Some of his students erected a monument to his memory, which was later destroyed by accident; only the inscription is preserved.

== Works ==
- Dialogi Sacri. Geneva 1542, also a much expanded version, Basel 1545
- Biblia interprete Sebastiano Castalione. Basel 1551
- Treatise on Heretics. Basel 1554
- Against Calvin's Booklet. Basel 1554 (first edition 1612)
- Castellio Bible. Basel 1555
- De arte dubitandi.
- Advice to a desolate France. 1562
- De Imitatione Christi. 1563

== Bibliography ==
- Bainton, Roland (2005). Hunted heretic : the life and death of Michael Servetus, 1511-1553. Providence, R.I: Blackstone Editions Unitarian Universalist Historical Society. ISBN 0-9725017-3-8.
- Gordon, Bruce (2011). Calvin. New Haven Conn. London: Yale University Press. ISBN 978-0-300-17084-9.
- Jack, Kristin (2023). Fire and Faith: The Untold Story of Sebastian Castellio's Epic Battle with John Calvin. ISBN 978-0-473-69823-2
- Guggisberg, Hans R. (2003). Bruce Gordon (ed.). Sebastian Castellio, 1515–1563: Humanist and Defender of Religious Toleration in a Confessional Age. Aldershot: Ashgate. ISBN 0-7546-3019-6.
- Zweig, Stefan (1936). Castellio gegen Calvin oder Ein Gewissen gegen die Gewalt [Castellio against Calvin or a conscience against violence]. Vienna: H. Reichner. OCLC 1903690.
- Zweig, Stefan (1951). Erasmus; The Right to Heresy: Castellio against Calvin. London: Cassell. OCLC 24340377.
- Greminger, Ueli (2015). Sebastian Castellio - Eine Biographie aus den Wirren der Reformationszeit. Zürich: Orell Fuessli. ISBN 978-3-280-05597-7.
