= Hieronymus Froben =

Swiss printer (1501–1563)

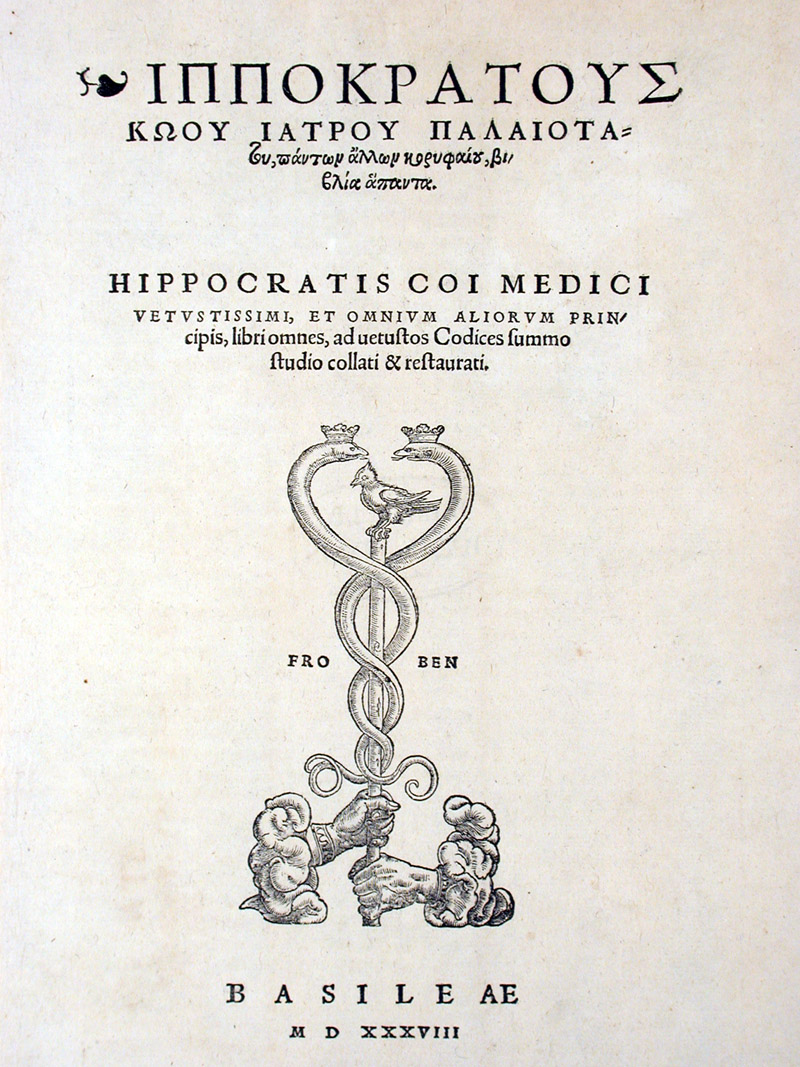
Title page from a 1538 edition of Hippocrates with the Froben publishing house logo

Hieronymus Froben (1501–1563) was a famous pioneering printer in Basel and the eldest son of Johann Froben. He was educated at the University of Basel and traveled widely in Europe.

He, his father and his brother-in-law Nicolaus Episcopius were noted for their working friendship with Erasmus and for making Basel an important center of Renaissance printing. He published hundreds of works written by Erasmus. He also published the first Latin edition of Georgius Agricola's De Re Metallica in 1556, and some of them incorporate artwork by Hans Holbein the Younger. Through his own sons, Ambrosius and Aurelius, the family continued their printing concern through the end of the next century.
