= Johann Froben =

Swiss printer, publisher, and humanist (died 1527)

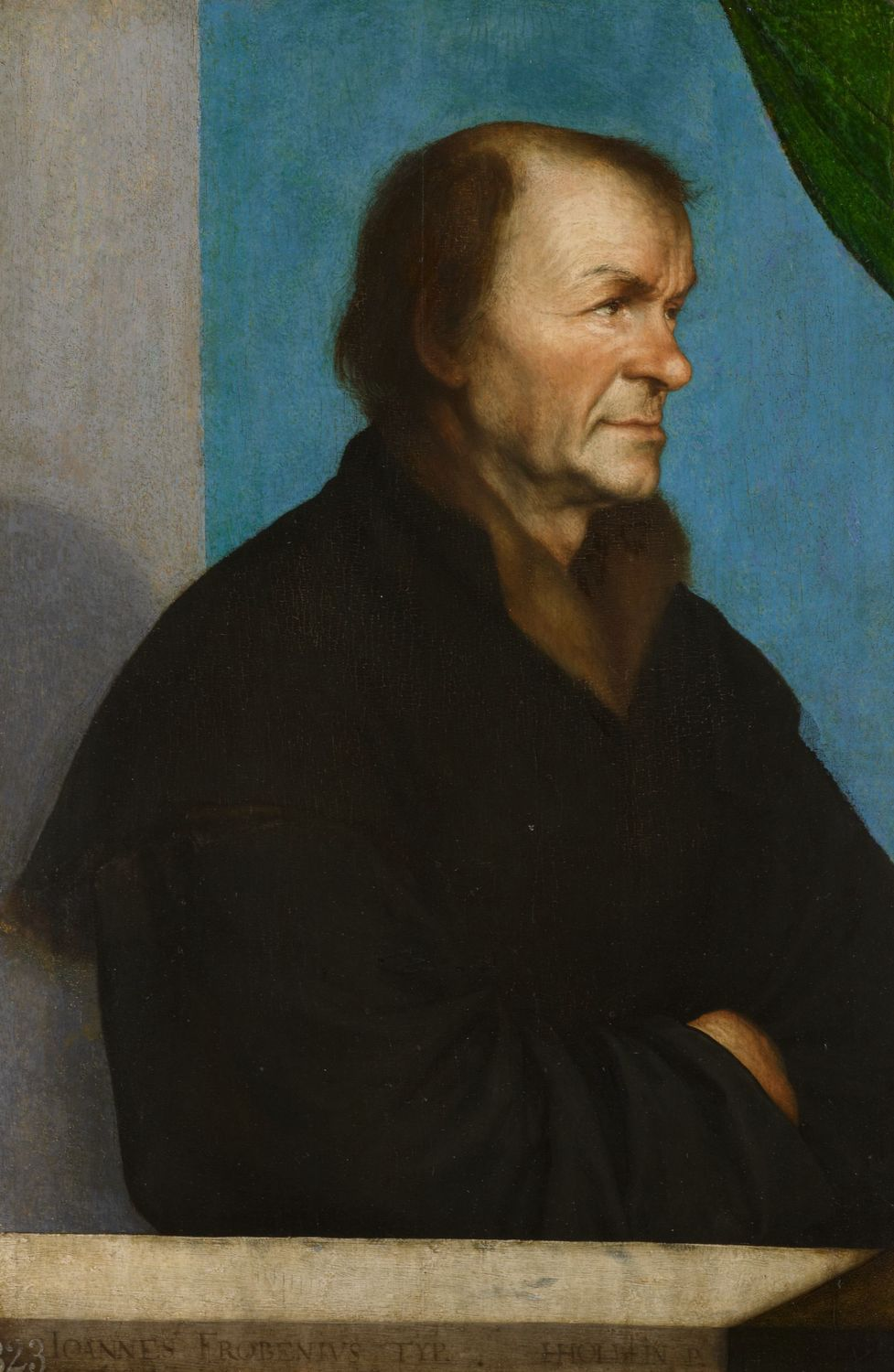
Portrait of Johann Froben by Hans Holbein the Younger, 1522–23. Froben commissioned many book illustrations from Holbein.

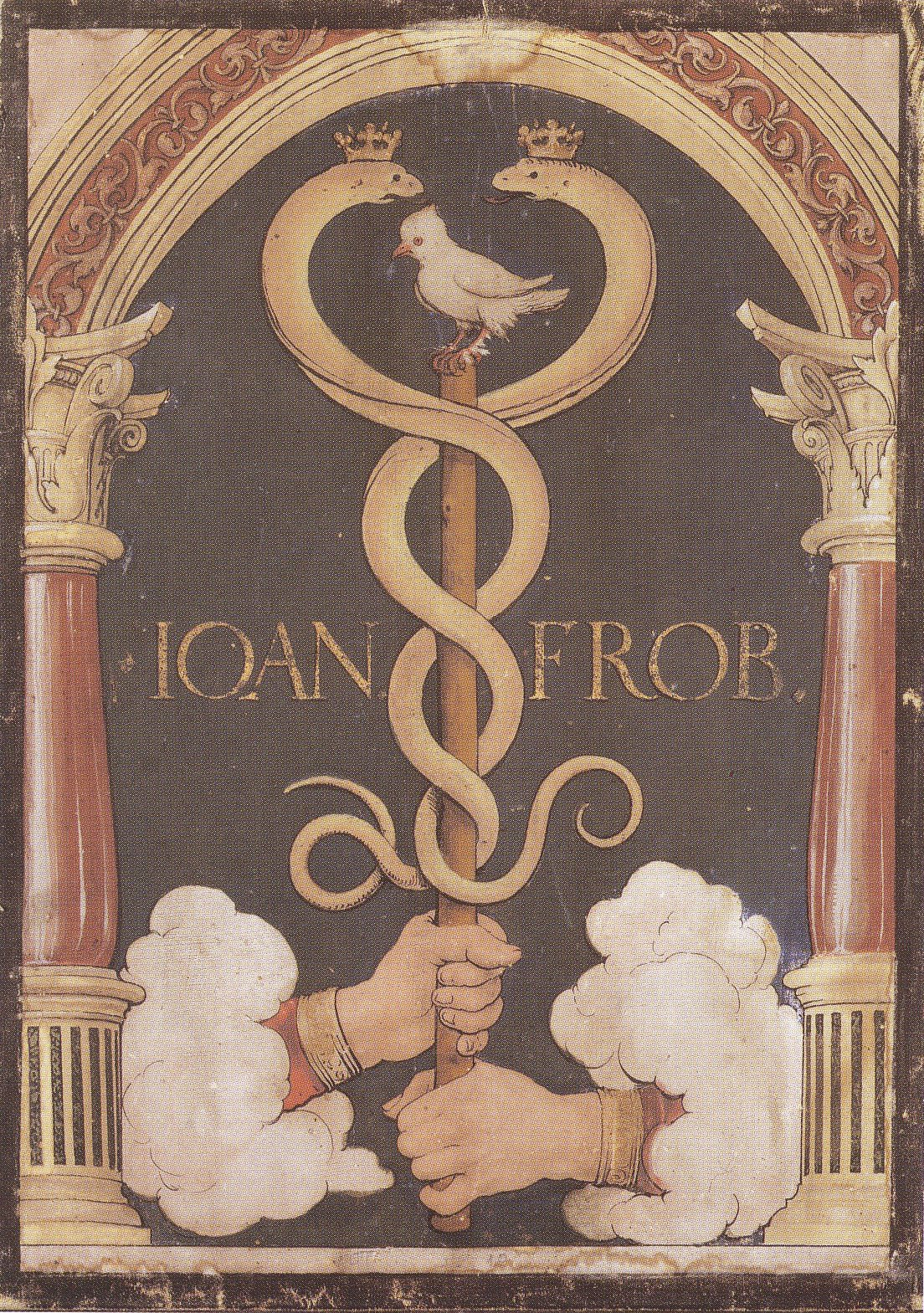
Printer's device of Johann Froben, by Hans Holbein the Younger, c. 1523

Johann Froben, in Latin: Johannes Frobenius (and combinations), (c. 1460 – 27 October 1527) was a famous printer, publisher and learned Renaissance humanist in Basel. He was a close friend of Erasmus and cooperated closely with Hans Holbein the Younger. He made Basel one of the world's leading centres of the book trade. He passed his printing business on to his son, Hieronymus, and grandson, Ambrosius Frobenius.

== Early life and printing partnership ==
Johann Froben was born in Hammelburg, Franconia and appears the first time at the workshop of the printer of Anton Koberger of Nuremberg in 1486. He moved to Basel in the 1480s. He graduated from the University in Basel, where he made the acquaintance of the famous printer Johann Amerbach (c. 1440–1513). Froben established himself as a printer in that city about 1491, when he published the first manageable bible in the octavo format. He soon attained a European reputation for accuracy and taste. In 1500, he married the daughter of the bookseller Wolfgang Lachner, Gertrude Lachner, who entered into a partnership with him. It was part of Froben's plan to print editions of the Greek Fathers. In 1492 he printed Johann Heynlin's Resolutorum Dubiuosum. For the books Decretum (1493) by Gratian and Decretales (1494) by Pope Gregory IX he employed Sebastian Brant as an editor. Between 1496 and 1512 he was in a printing alliance together with Amerbach, and Johannes Petri for larger projects like the collected works of Augustine of Hippo. The printing partnership would be known as the Three Hannsen (Hannsen meant as an abbreviation of Johannes). In 1507 he bought Amerbach’s printing house in the Haus zum Sessel. But the partnership ended as by 1513, Petri and Amerbach had died.

== Printing career ==
In 1513, he carefully published a copy of Erasmus’s Adagia, with a cover designed by Urs Graf depicting the gods Nemesis and Caerus, with an allegory of a triumphant Humanitas in a chariot pulled by Homer and Demosthenes, and pushed by Cicero and Vergil. In 1514 Erasmus settled to Basel.

Froben became friends with Erasmus, who lived in his house when in Basel, and not only had his own works printed by him from 1514, but superintended Froben's editions of Jerome, Cyprian, Tertullian, Hilary of Poitiers and Ambrose. His printing of Erasmus’s Novum Testamentum (1516) was used by Martin Luther for his translation. He and later his son published more than 200 works by Erasmus of Rotterdam. Through a deeply ramificated web of distributors the works of the Frobens reached the European book market in Venice, London, Frankfurt and Paris in a timely manner.

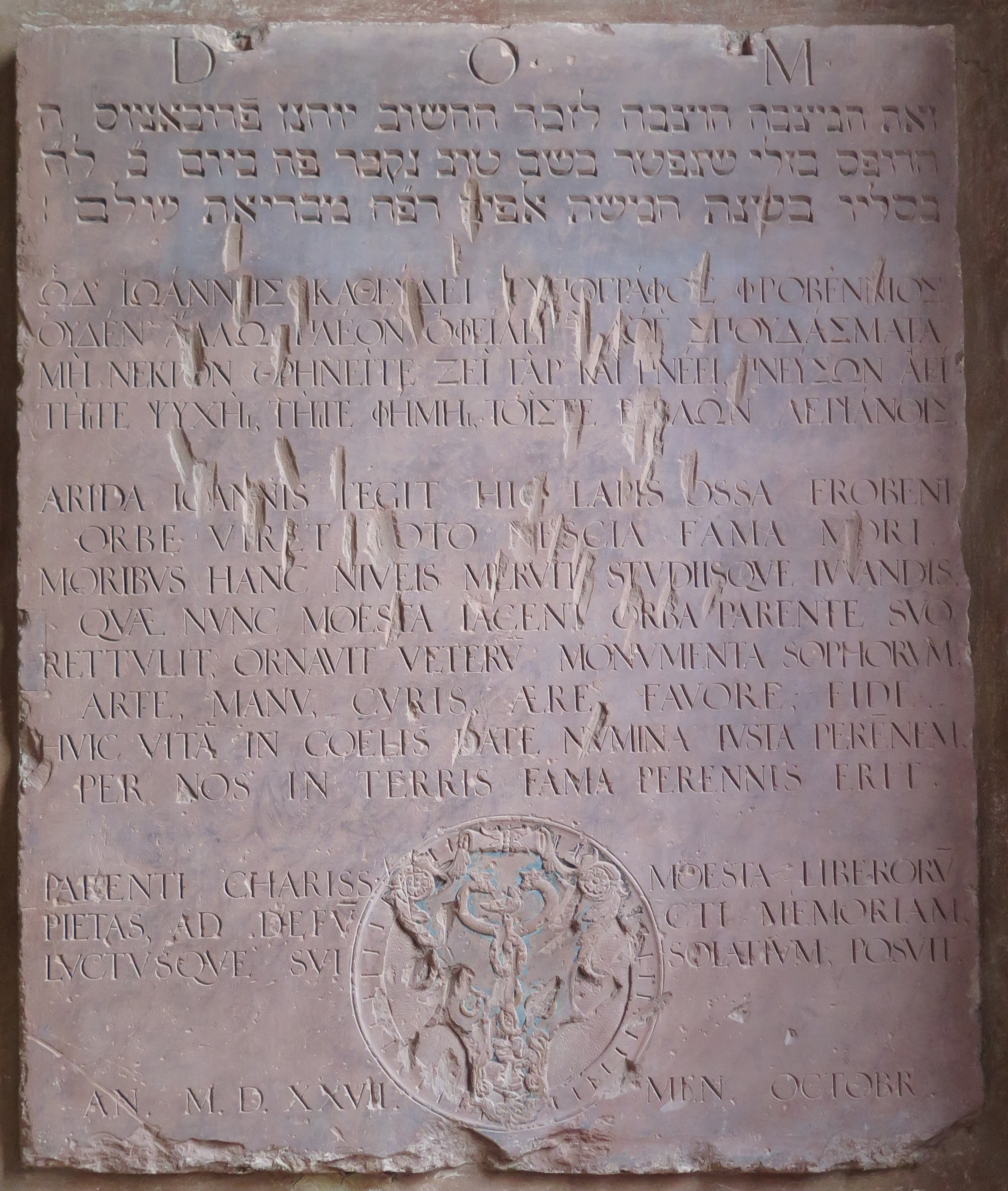
Epitaph for Johann Froben in Basel Peterskirche

Froben employed Hans Holbein the Younger, Urs Graf and Albrecht Dürer to illustrate his texts. Graf was the one who designed his device. Besides he also employed well known formschneiders like Jakob Faber (the "Master IF") and Hans Lützelburger, who was regarded as one of the finest formscheiders of his time. Holbein painted a portrait of Froben in the 1520s. Holbein also painted the device with Hermes’ caduceus which Froben used from 1523 onwards.

== Death ==
Upon his death in October 1527 in Basel, Froben was succeeded by his son Hieronymus Froben, who carried on the business in collaboration with Johann Herwagen and later Nikolaus Episcopius. Johannes Froben’s memorial plaque in the Hebrew – Greek – Latin languages is located in the Peter’s Church in Basel which has been used as a reformed church since 1529. The church does not contain the remains of those who are memorialized within. The park across the street from the church was once a graveyard, and it is believed that it is there where the now unmarked remains lie.

Froben is, through his descendant Anna Catharina Bischoff, a direct ancestor of the former British Prime Minister Boris Johnson. The young woman pictured with his memorial plaque in the notes section below is his American 11th great-granddaughter, whose mother's maiden name is Frobenius.

== Legacy ==
Froben's work in Basel made that city in the 16th century the leading center of the Swiss book trade. An existing letter of Erasmus, written in the year of Froben's death, gives an idea of his life and an estimate of his character; and in it Erasmus mentions that his grief for the death of his friend was far more distressing than that which he had felt for the loss of his own brother, adding that "all the apostles of science ought to wear mourning". The epistle concludes with an epitaph in Greek and Latin. He was well known for his Greek typeface, and he was also one of the first printers to have had their own Hebrew typeface. According to Beatus Rhenanus, who was one of his employees, he published only prominent works and despised the lesser ones.

Johann Froben' marks

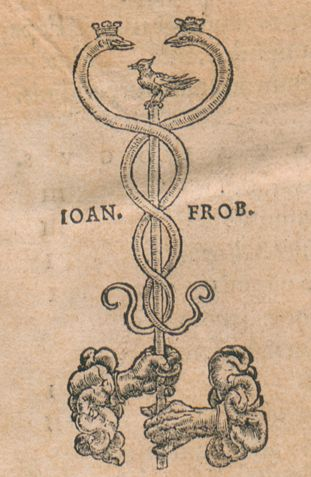

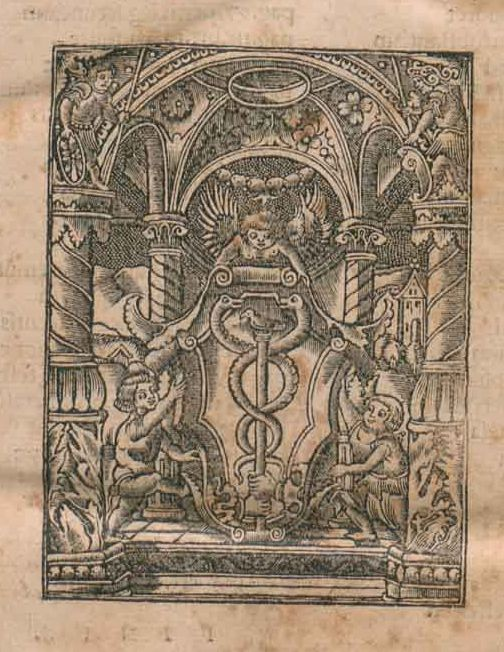
