= A Conscience Against Violence =

Polemical essay by Stefan Zweig

A Conscience against Violence is a polemical essay by Stefan Zweig (1936) that depicts the struggle between Sebastian Castellio and John Calvin. The book was written during the rise of fascism in Europe.

== Title ==
The exact title in German is "Ein Gewissen gegen die Gewalt", which translates to "A Conscience against Violence", capturing the rebellion of an individual against the power of authority. The title is a reference to a quote by Michel de Montaigne, one of the great representatives of humanism.

== Story ==
During the 16th century, in the era of the Protestant Reformation, Geneva was under the control of Calvin, who established a theocratic regime coexisting with a state subjected to the will of the new Church. The Genevans were forbidden from wearing rosaries, crucifixes, and were subjected to various austere rules. Michael Servetus, a thinker who happened to disagree with Calvin's authority, was attacked and quickly condemned to death. He was publicly burned at the stake. Another scholar, Castellio, then decided to rehabilitate Servetus, leading him into a long and challenging struggle between Calvinist austerity and the power of the Catholic Inquisition.
