= Pierre Robert Olivétan =

Pierre Robert Olivetan/Olivétan (c. 1506 – 1538), a Waldensian by faith, was the first translator of the Bible into the French language on the basis of Hebrew and Greek texts, rather than from Latin. He was a cousin of John Calvin, who wrote a Latin preface for the translation, often called the Olivetan Bible (French).

His work was based on that of his teacher Jacques Lefèvre d'Etaples. It was published in 1535 as La Bible Qui est toute la Saincte scripture at Neuchâtel. This translation has been considered the first French Protestant Bible.
