= Musical Instrument Museum (Phoenix) =

Museum in Phoenix, Arizona

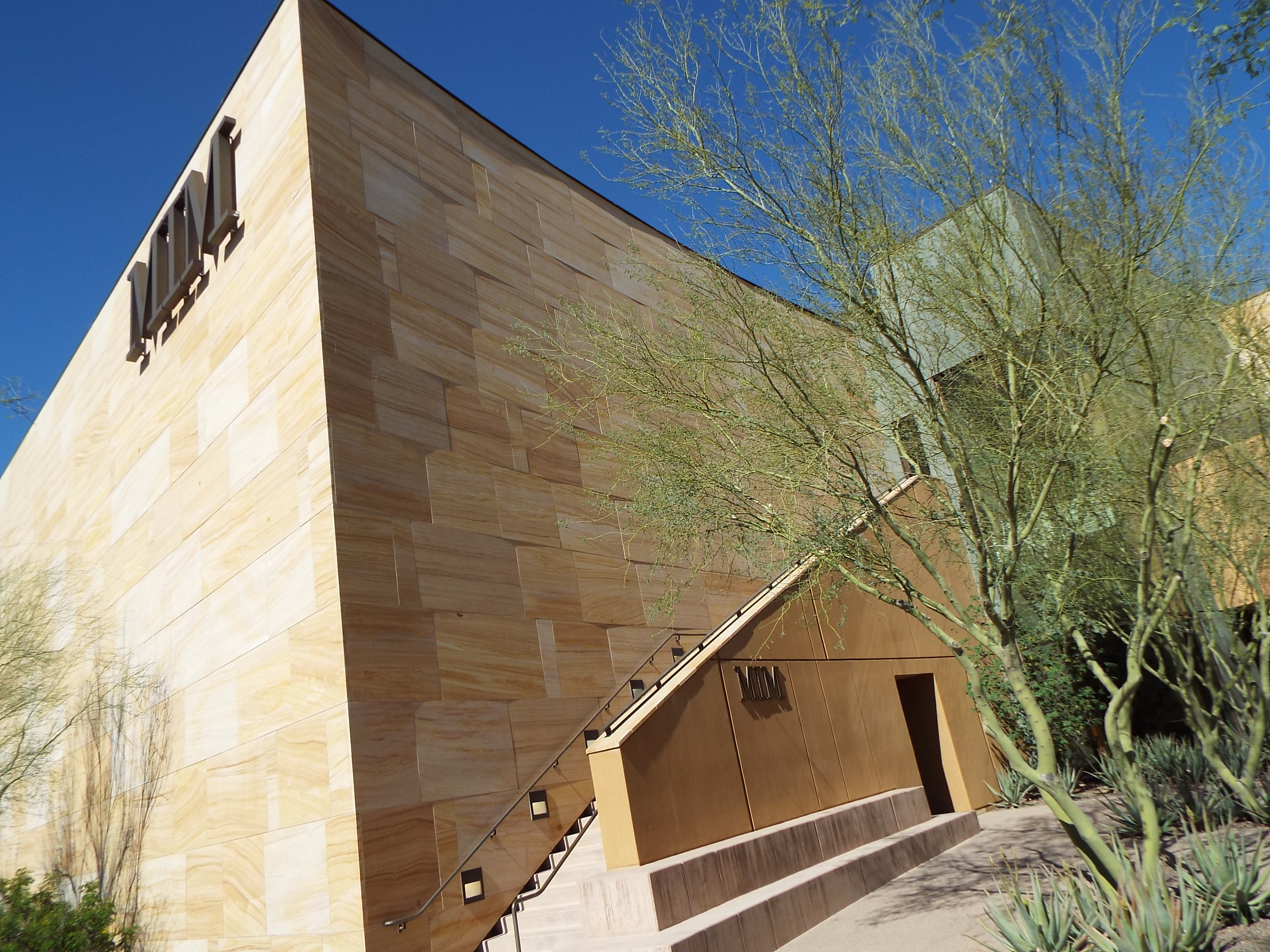
- Established: April 2010
- Location: 4725 E. Mayo Boulevard, Phoenix, Arizona
- Coordinates: 33.667454°N 111.978671°W
- Type: musical instruments
- Website: MIM.org

The Musical Instrument Museum (MIM) is located in Phoenix, Arizona. Opened in April 2010, it is the largest museum of its type in the world. The collection of over 15,000 musical instruments and associated objects includes examples from nearly 200 countries and territories, representing every inhabited continent. Some larger countries such as the United States, Mexico, India, China, and Brazil have multiple displays with subsections for different types of ethnic, folk, and tribal music.

== Overview ==
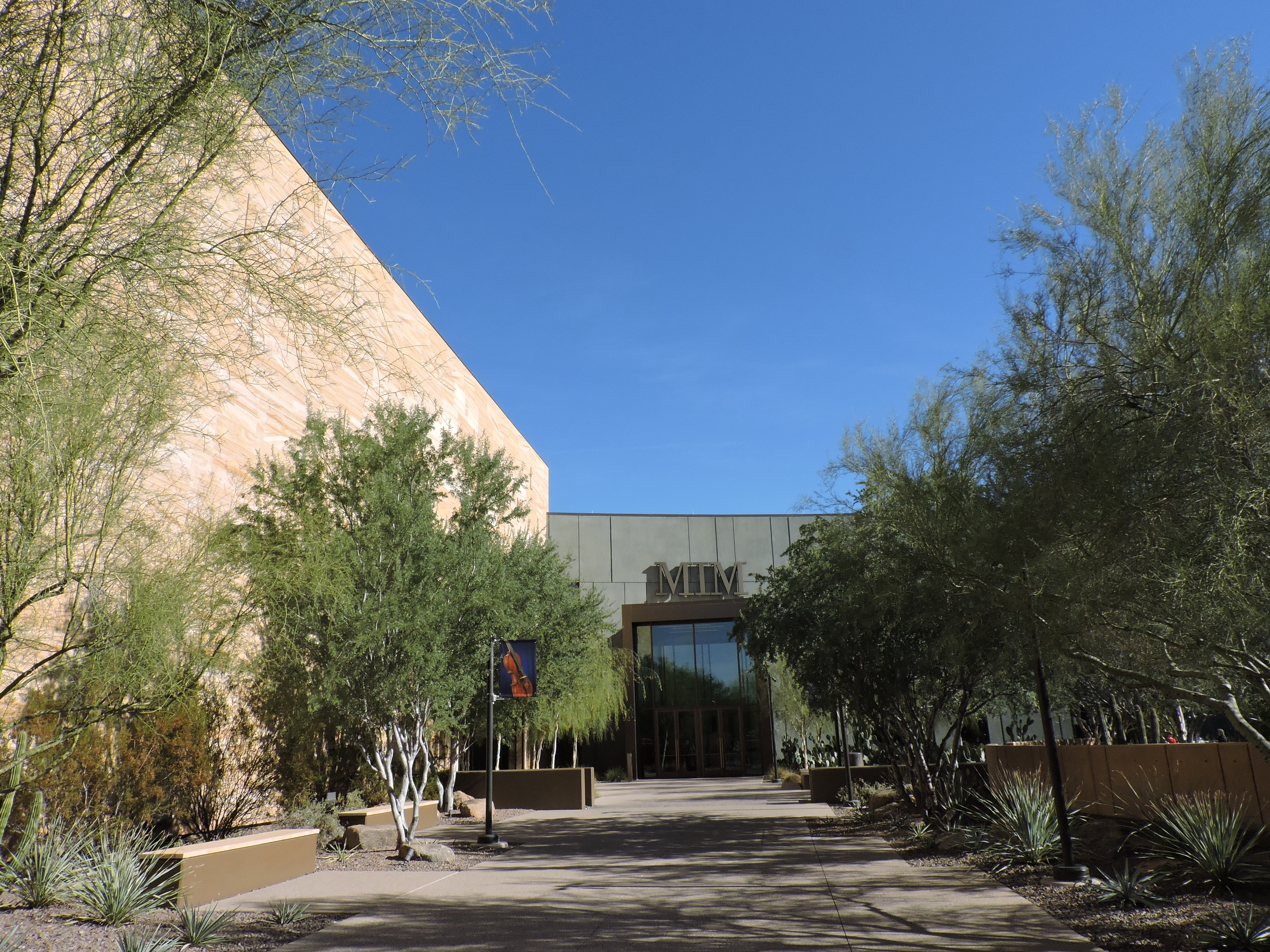
Main entrance to MIM

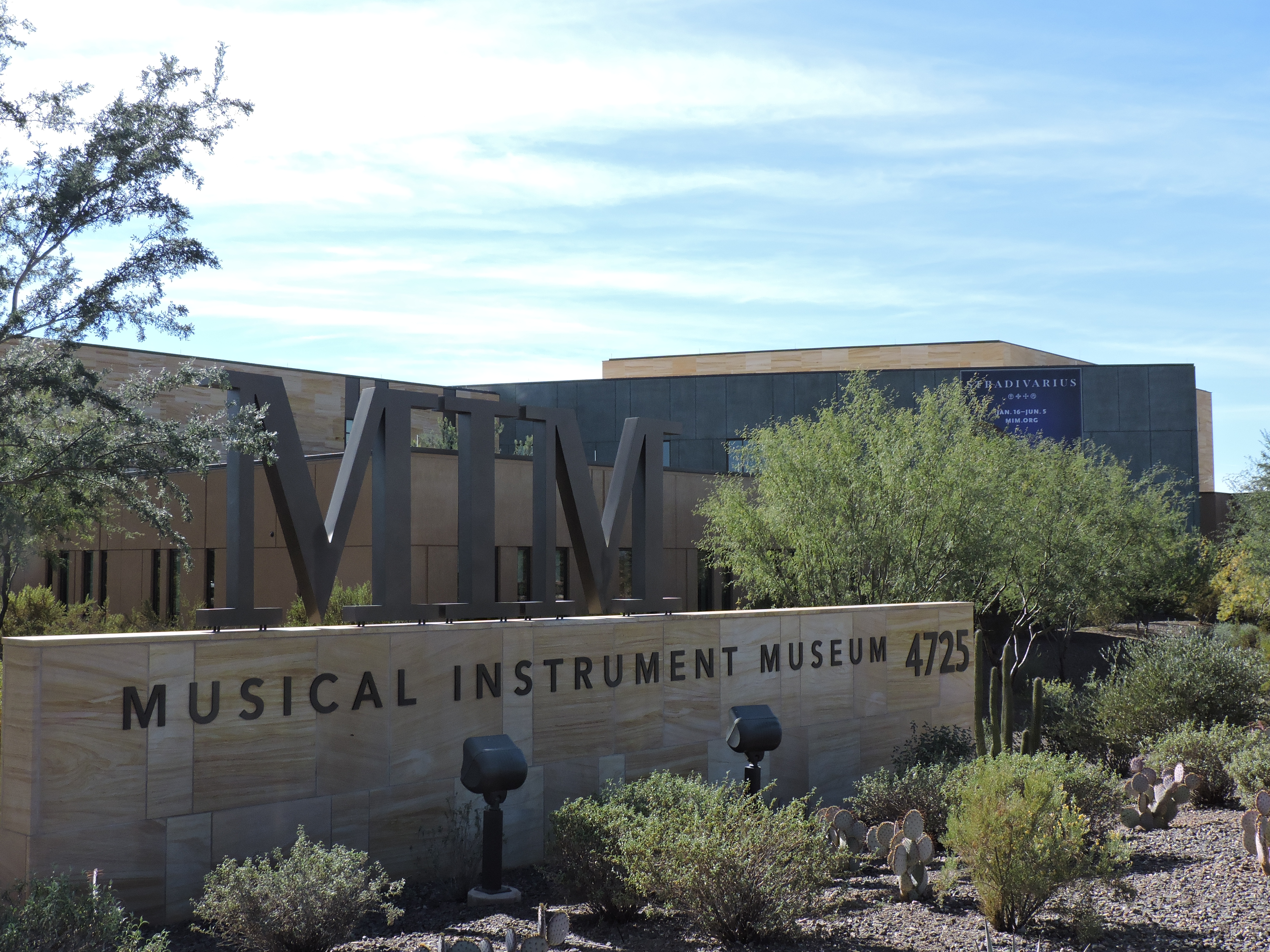
Street view of MIM

The Museum was founded by Robert J. Ulrich, former CEO and chairman of Target Corporation. A collector of African art and a world museum enthusiast, Ulrich and his friend Marc Felix originated the idea after a visit to the Musical Instrument Museum in Brussels, Belgium. The design of the museum benefited as well from the consultation of the Musée de la Musique in Paris modernised in 1997.

The contemporary building covers approximately 200,000 square-feet, with two floors of galleries. The museum was built at a cost of over US$250 million. The exhibit for each country features a flat-screen high-resolution video showing local musicians performing on native instruments. Visitors can listen to the performances through a wireless device with headphones that is activated automatically when an exhibit is being observed.

The facility contains a 299-seat theater for concerts, which are held primarily after regular hours. Joshua Bell recorded his album "French Impressions" in the theater in 2011. There is also a cafe with both indoor and outdoor seating.

A large number of musical artists have appeared at MIM, including Martha Reeves, Lyle Lovett, Wanda Jackson, Jordin Sparks, Ronnie Spector, Altan, Ramsey Lewis, and George Benson.

== Layout ==
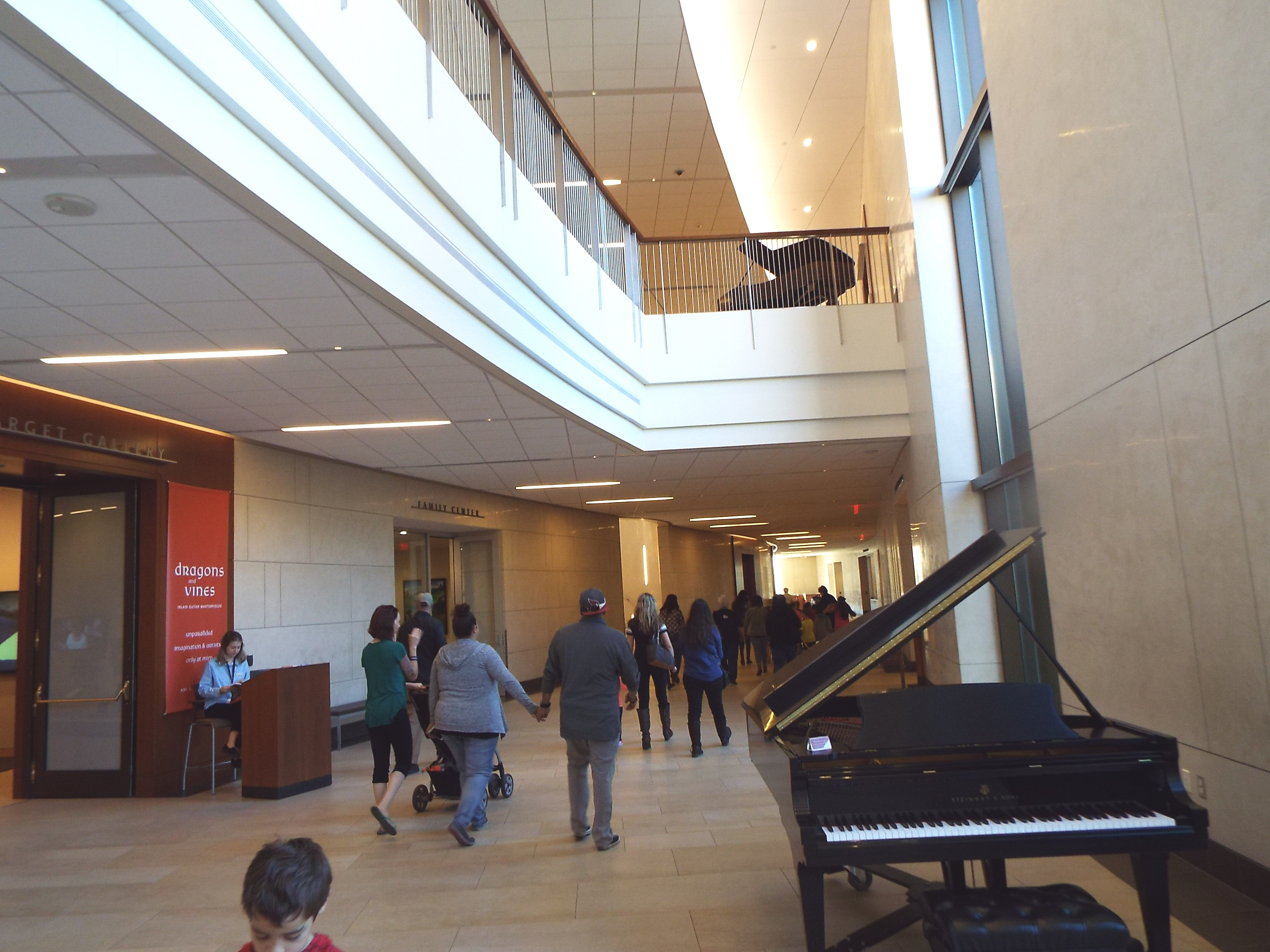
First floor of the Musical Instrument Museum

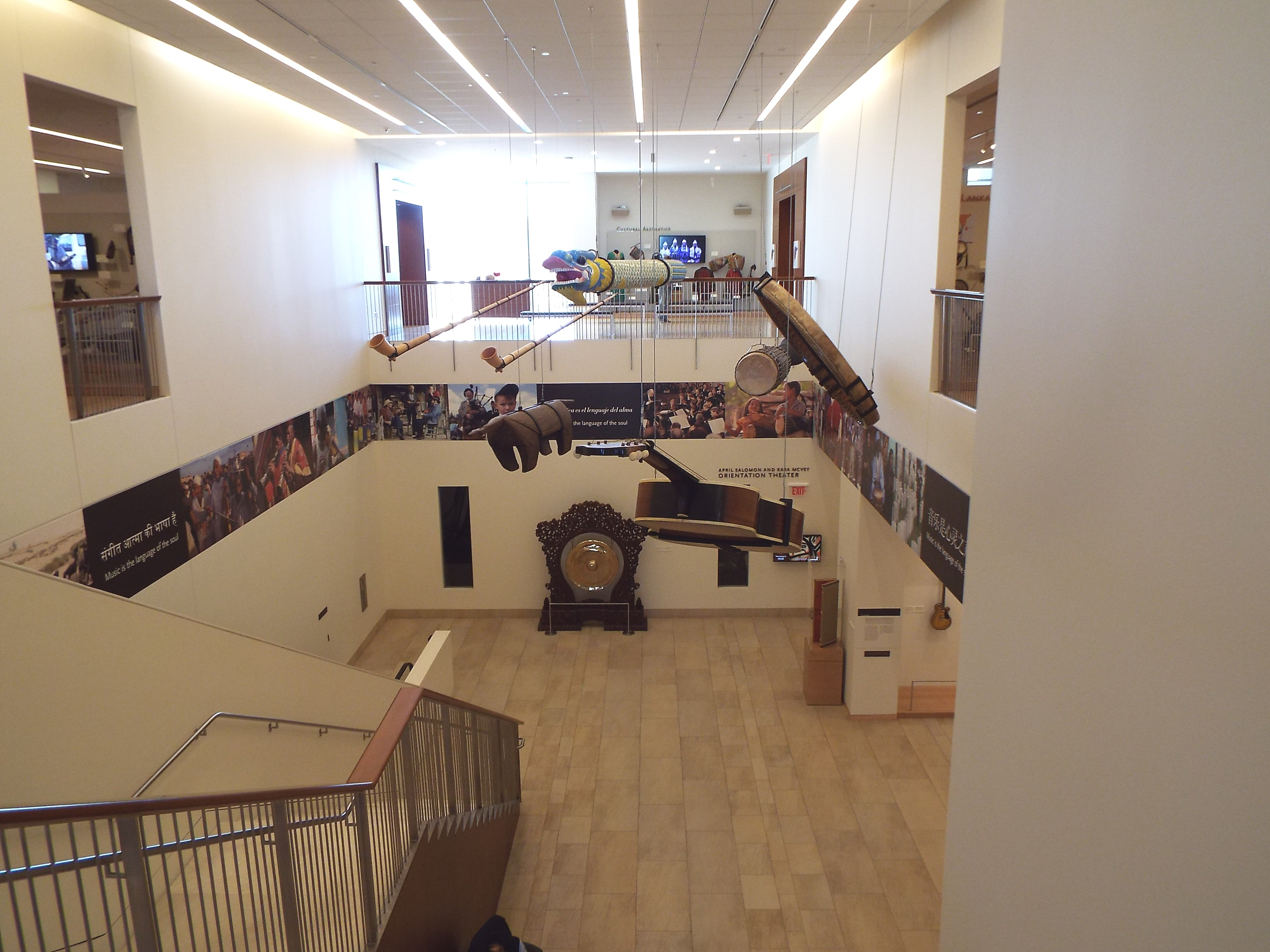
Musical instruments hanging from the ceiling

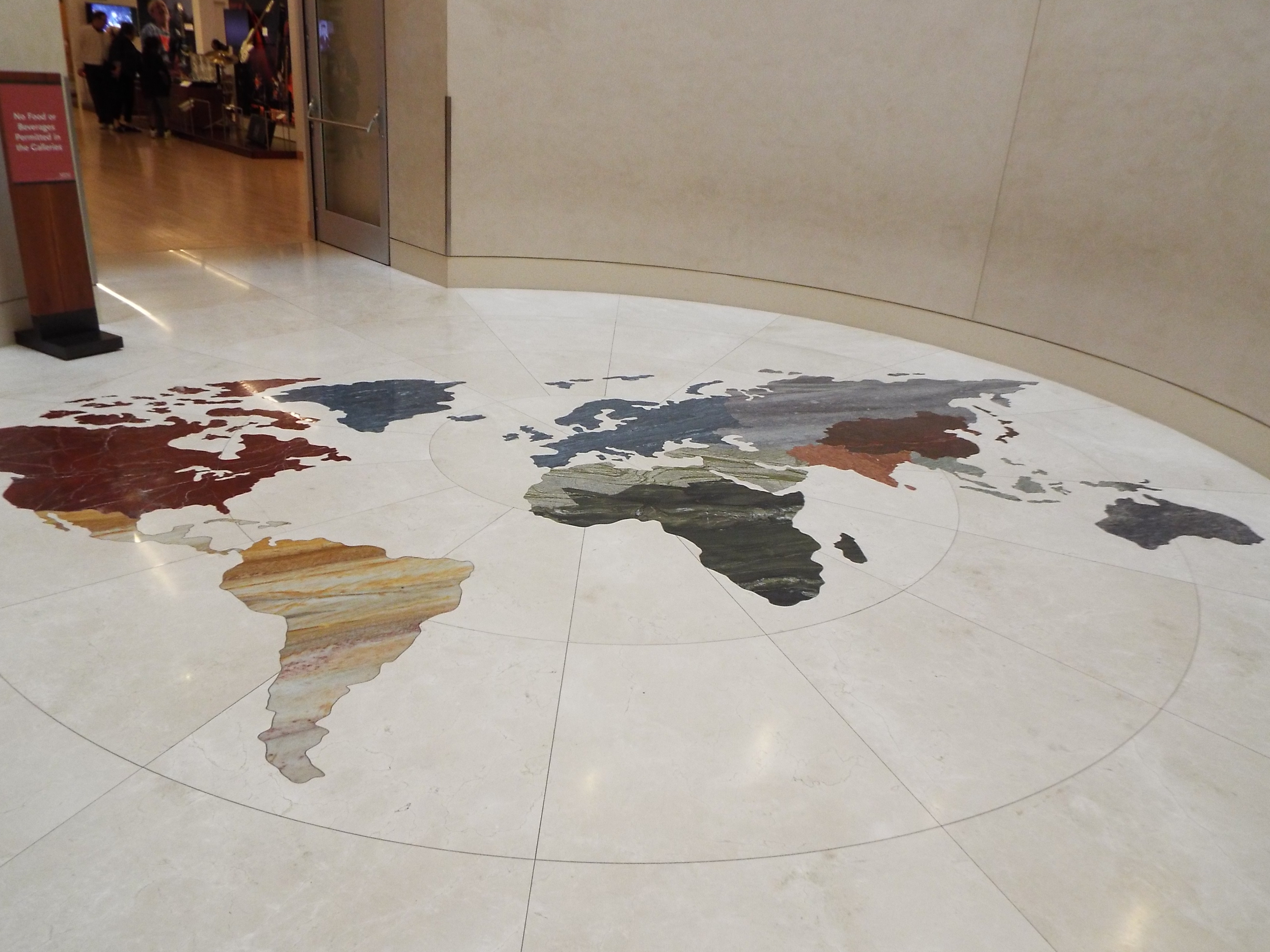
Floor representing the countries exhibited in the museum

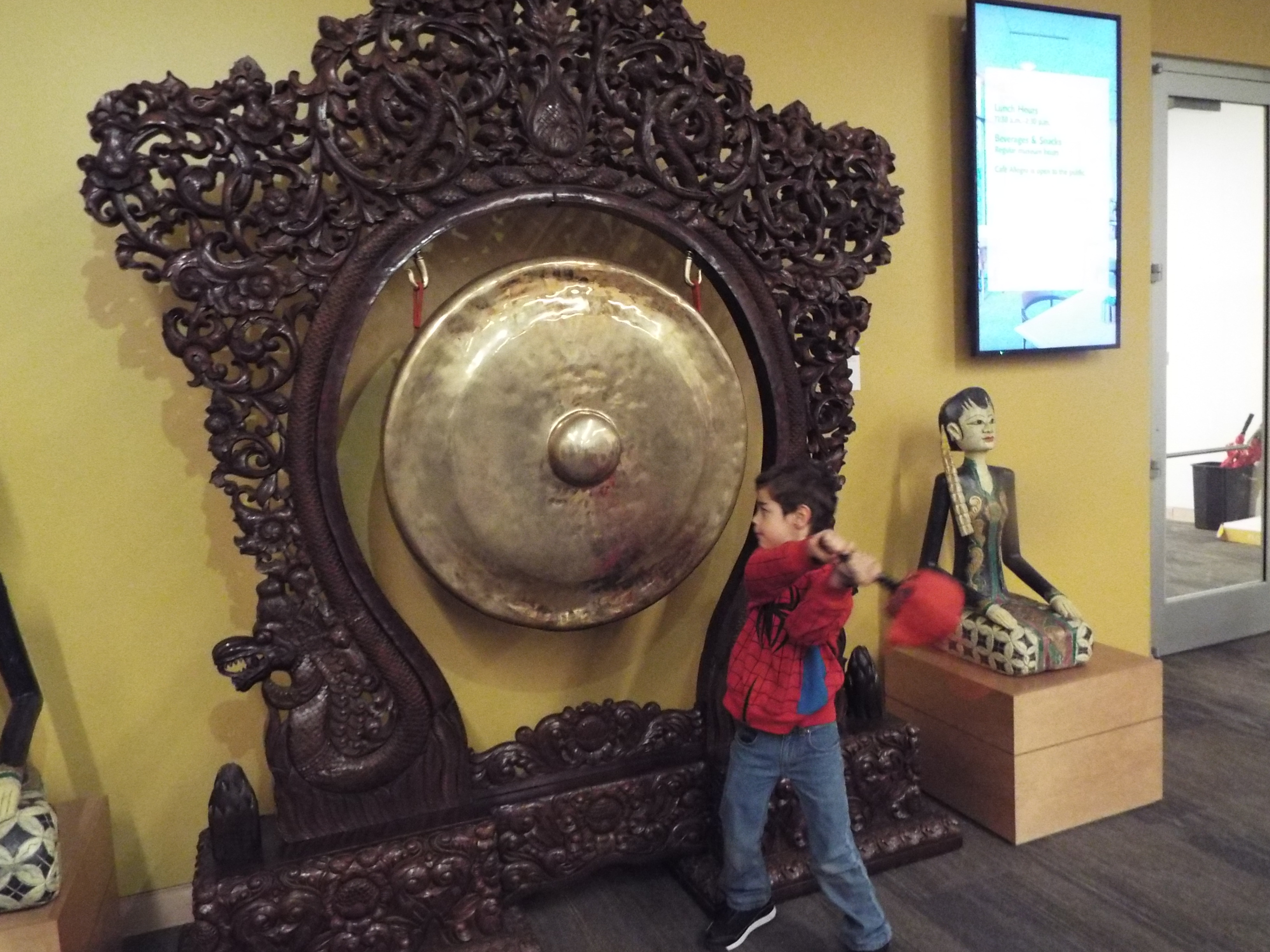
Child banging a "Gong" in the Experience Gallery

=== Ground Floor ===
- The Artist Gallery – Instruments, video concert footage, photographs, performance outfits, and other special items linked to notable musicians and music innovators. The gallery has included exhibits for musical artists such as Elvis Presley, Pablo Casals, John Lennon, King Sunny Adé, Taylor Swift, and many others from around the world.
- The Experience Gallery – MIM's Experience Gallery invites guests of all ages to touch, play, and hear a changing array of instruments from many different cultures. Guests can try their hands at new instruments such as drums, guitars, and harps.
- The Mechanical Music Gallery – MIM's Mechanical Music Gallery features a selection of musical instruments such as player pianos, mechanical zithers, and cylinder music boxes that, by definition, “play themselves.”
- The Target Gallery – The Target Gallery complements the museum's permanent collection with traveling shows, special engagements, and changing exhibitions.
- The Conservation Lab – Seen through a large viewing window, MIM's Conservation Lab gives guests a behind-the-scenes glimpse at collection maintenance and preservation.
- Café Allegro – Café Allegro serves a daily-changing menu of foods. Stations feature global cuisine, local and regional dishes, grilled specialties, freshly made soups and salads, and desserts.
- Museum Store – The Museum Store is open daily to the public during museum hours and offers gift cards, a selection of books and CDs, instruments, handmade gifts and other musical things.
- MIM Music Theater – This concert hall offers an array of concerts by artists from every corner of the globe.
- The PNC Bank Family Center – MIM's Family Center is a peaceful space for families with little ones to take a break and play. The room includes seating areas, tables, a family restroom, a nursing room, toys, books, and plenty of space for kids to play.

=== Upper Level ===
MIM's collection is presented in Geographical Galleries that focus on five major world regions. Here it contains ethnic, tribal, and folk musical instruments or musical instruments from various parts of the world, These are:

- The Africa and Middle East gallery, which displays instruments and artifacts from sub-Saharan, North African, and Middle Eastern nations.
- The Asia and Oceania gallery, which features instruments from countries and island groups in five sub-galleries devoted to regions of East Asia, South Asia, Southeast Asia, Oceania, and Central Asia and the Caucasus.
- The Europe gallery, where guests encounter instruments ranging from an antique charter horn and a foot-operated drum kit to a child's vessel flute.
- The Latin America gallery, which features instruments and ensembles displayed in three sub-galleries: South America; Central America and Mexico; and the Caribbean.
- The United States/Canada gallery, where guests can observe an array of instruments that shaped the North American musical landscape, including the Appalachian dulcimer, sousaphone, ukulele, and electric guitar. Special exhibits focus on American musical-instrument manufacturers, including Fender, Martin, and Steinway.
- The Collier STEM Gallery, where guests may experience "How Science Brings Music to Life" featuring a deconstructed Stratocaster guitar and displays explaining soundwaves, amplitude, frequency, wavelength, and timbre.

== Museum galleries ==
The museum is a collection of instruments and exhibits including geographic galleries that focus on the five major world regions.

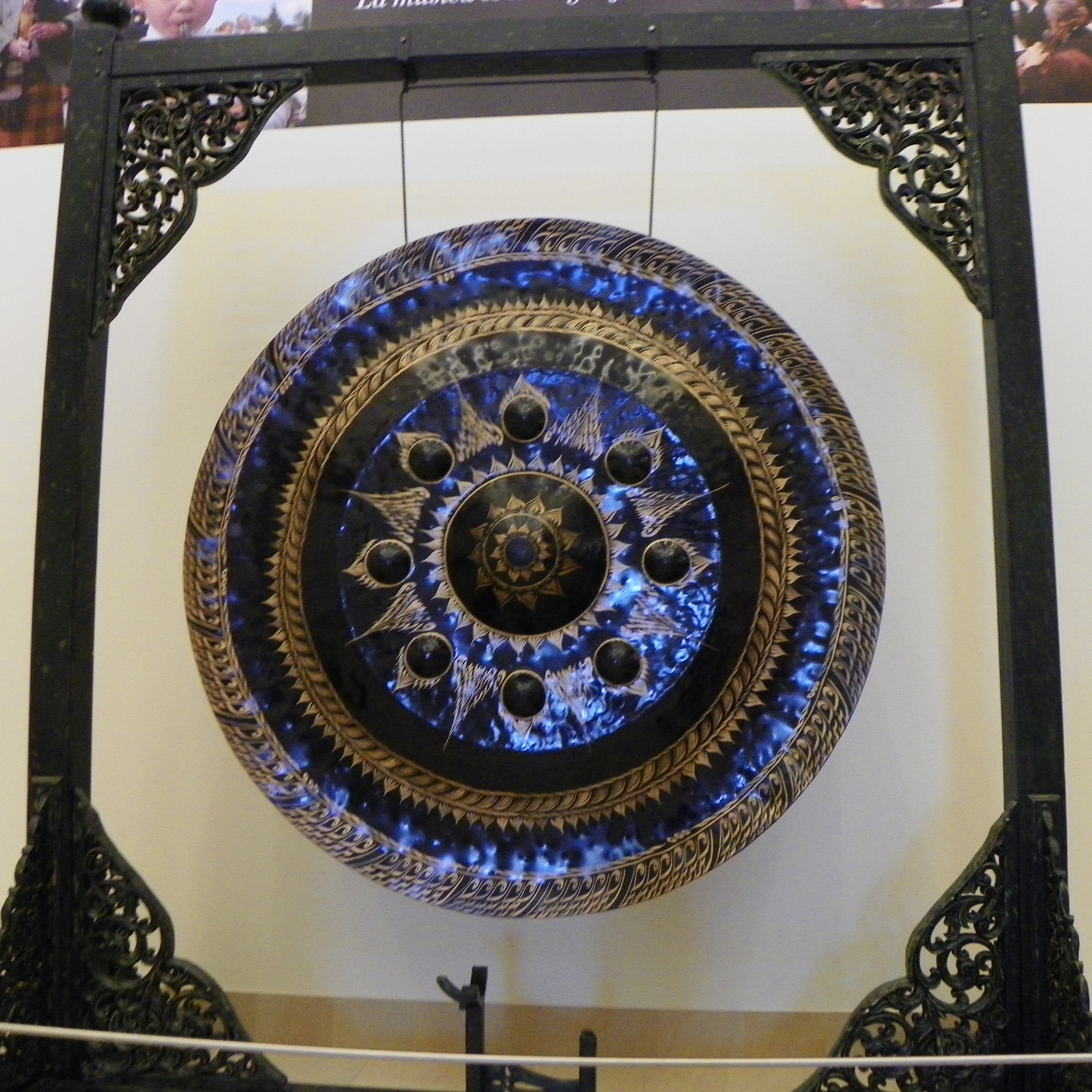
Gong

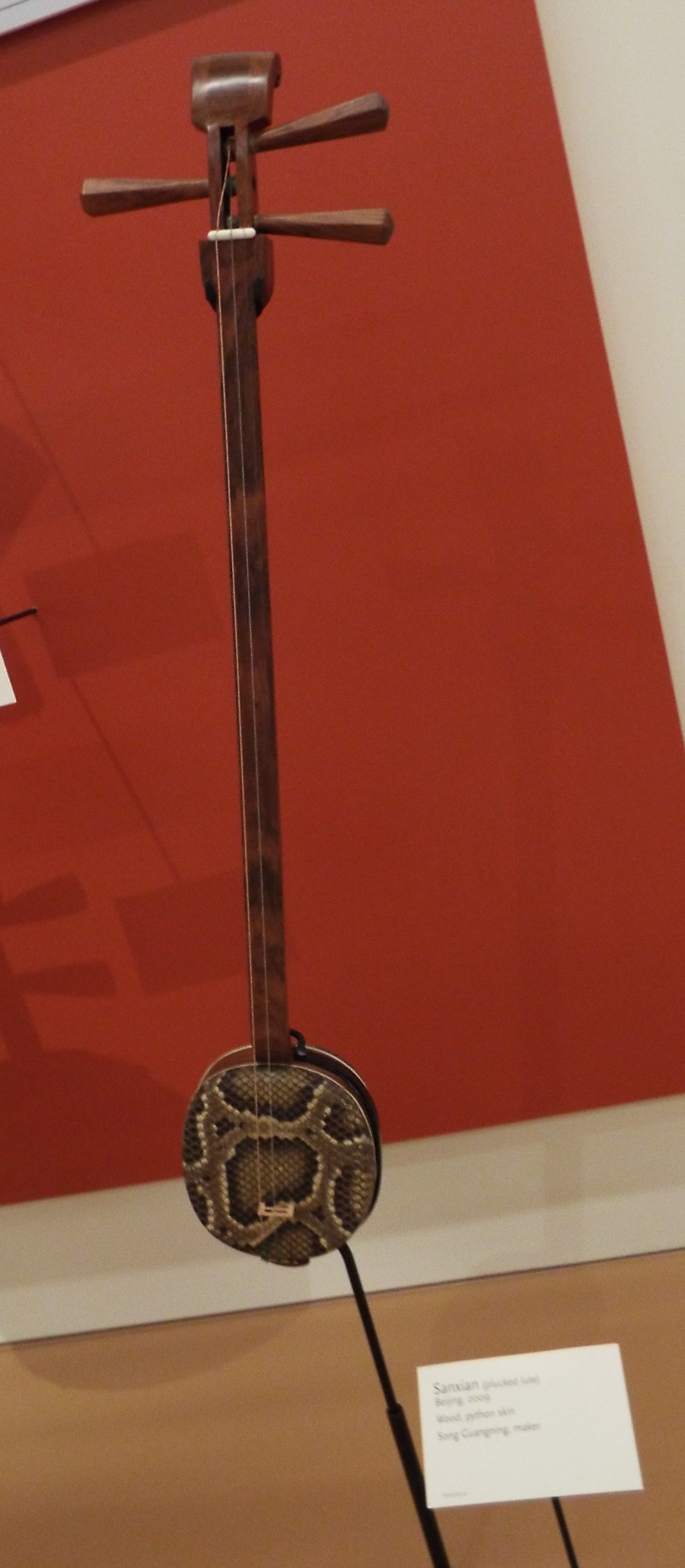
A Sanxian from China

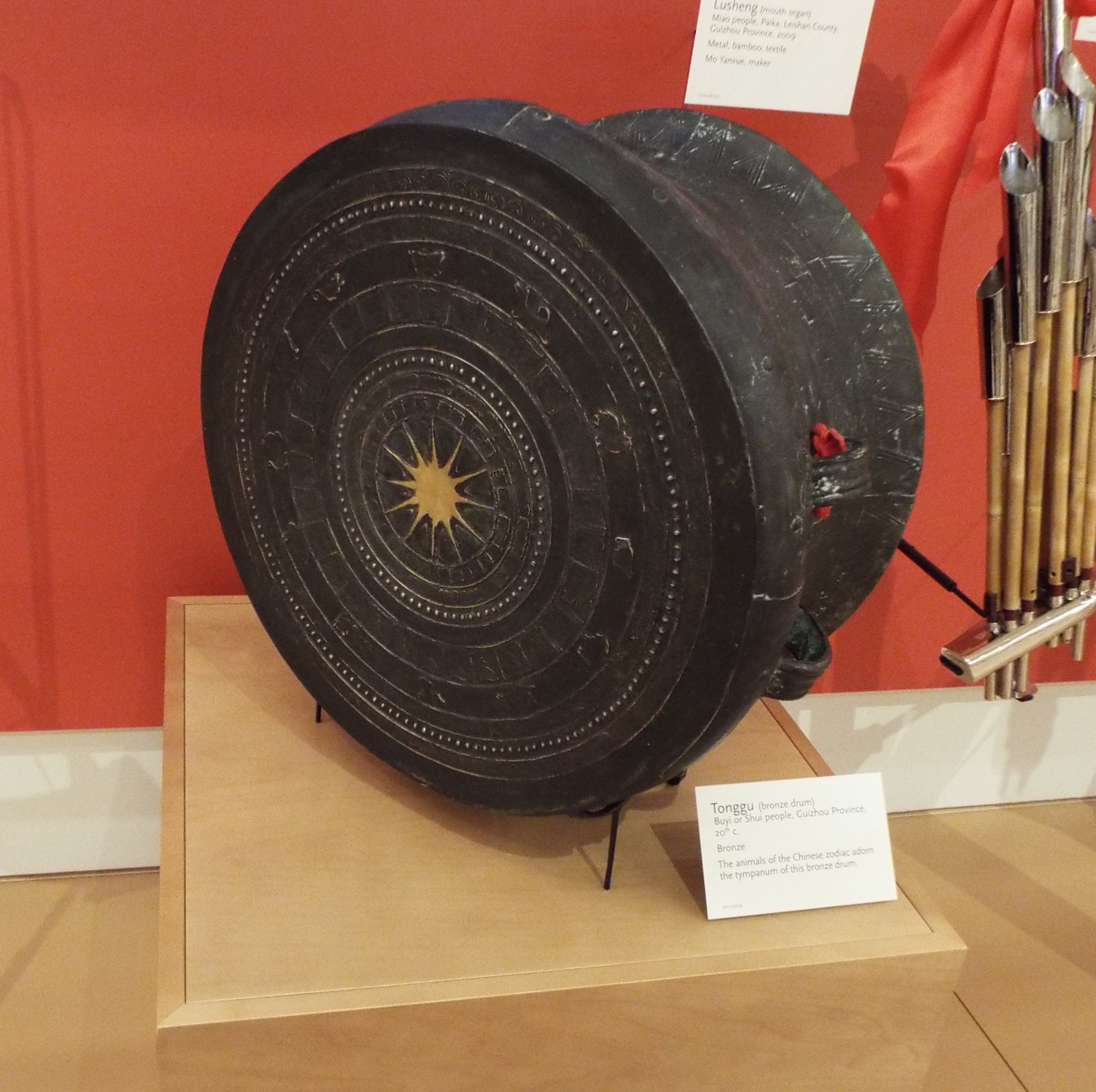
A Tonggu (1900) from China

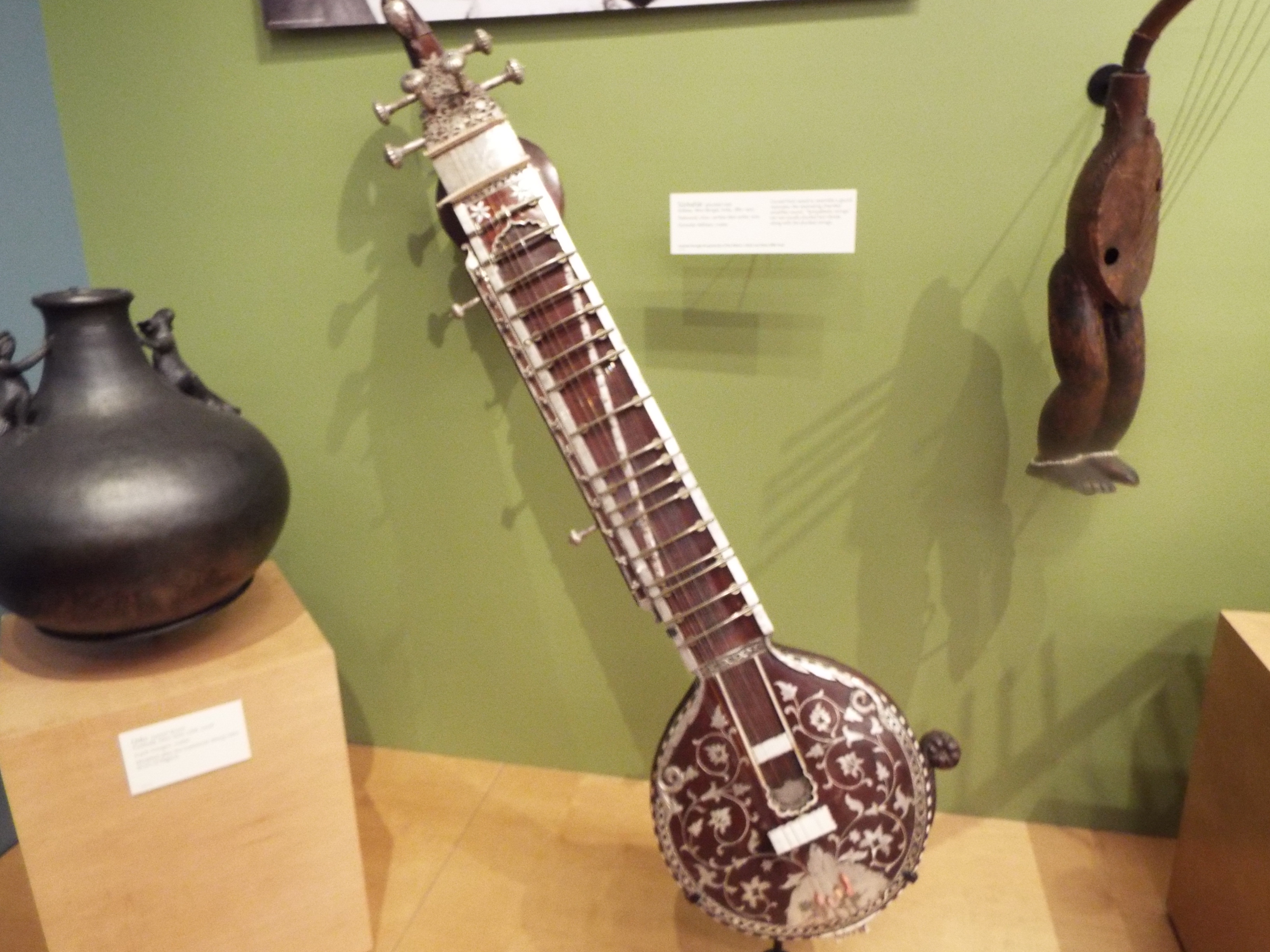
A Surbahar from India

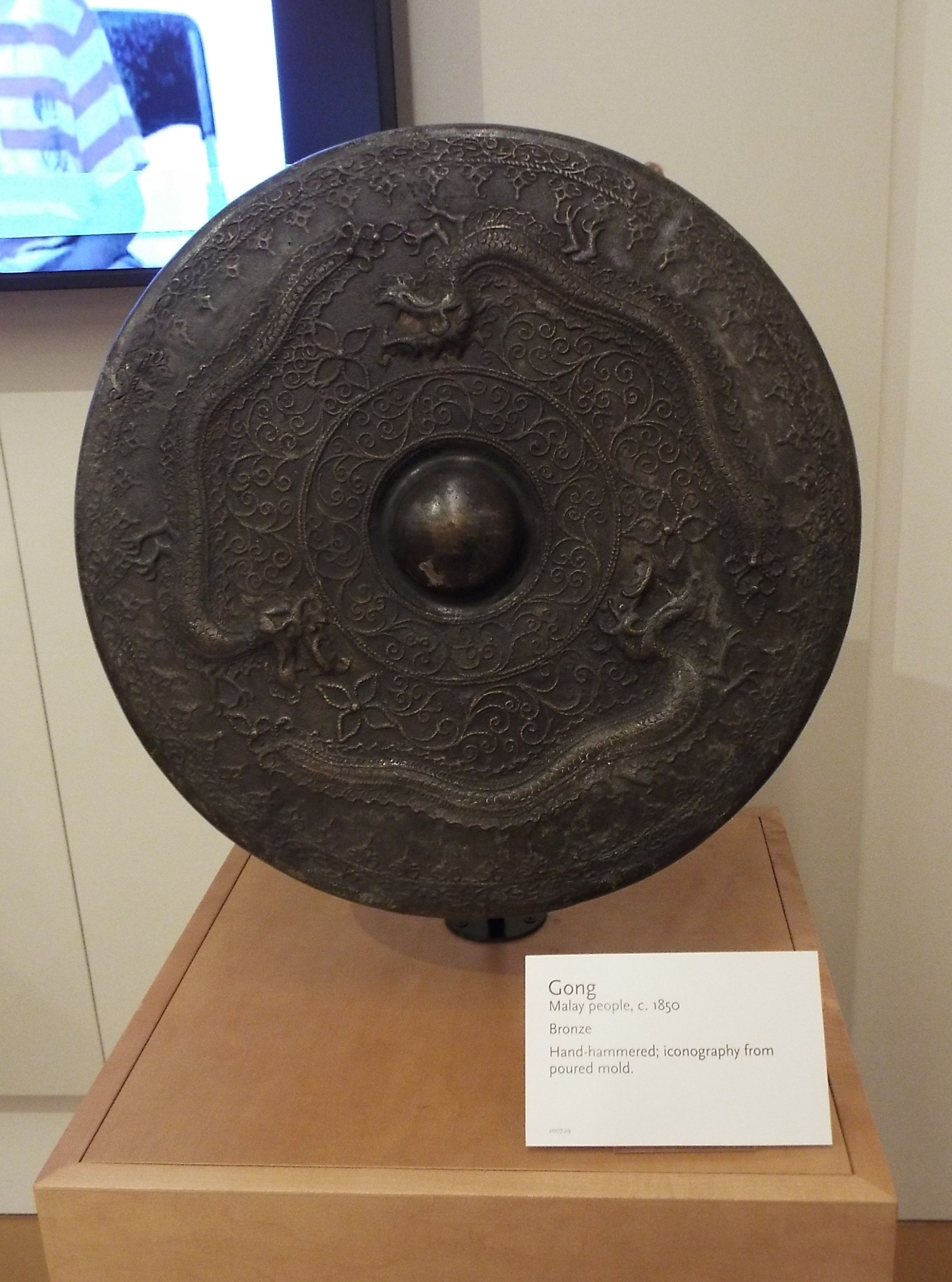
A Gong (1850) from Malaysia

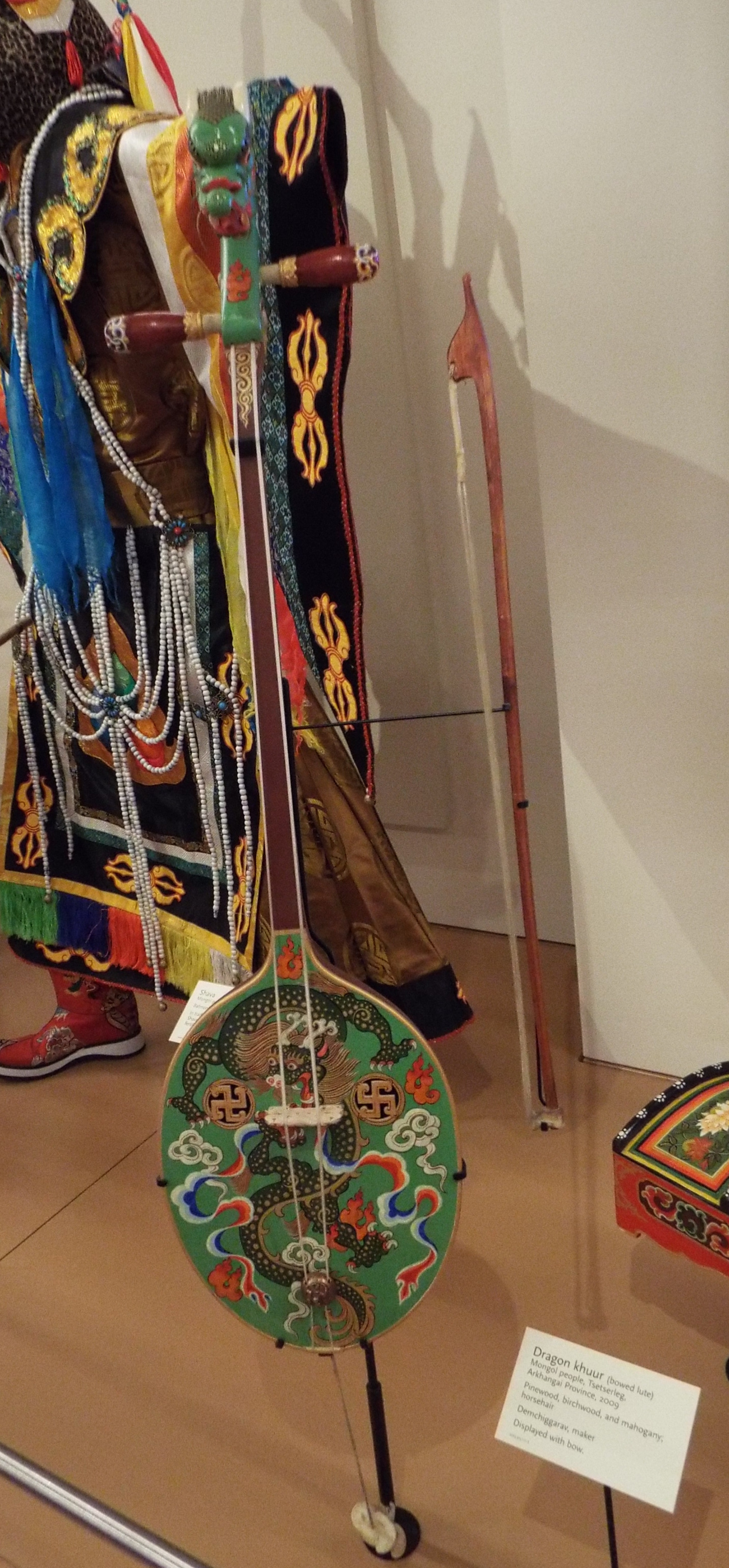
A Dragon Khuur from Mongolia

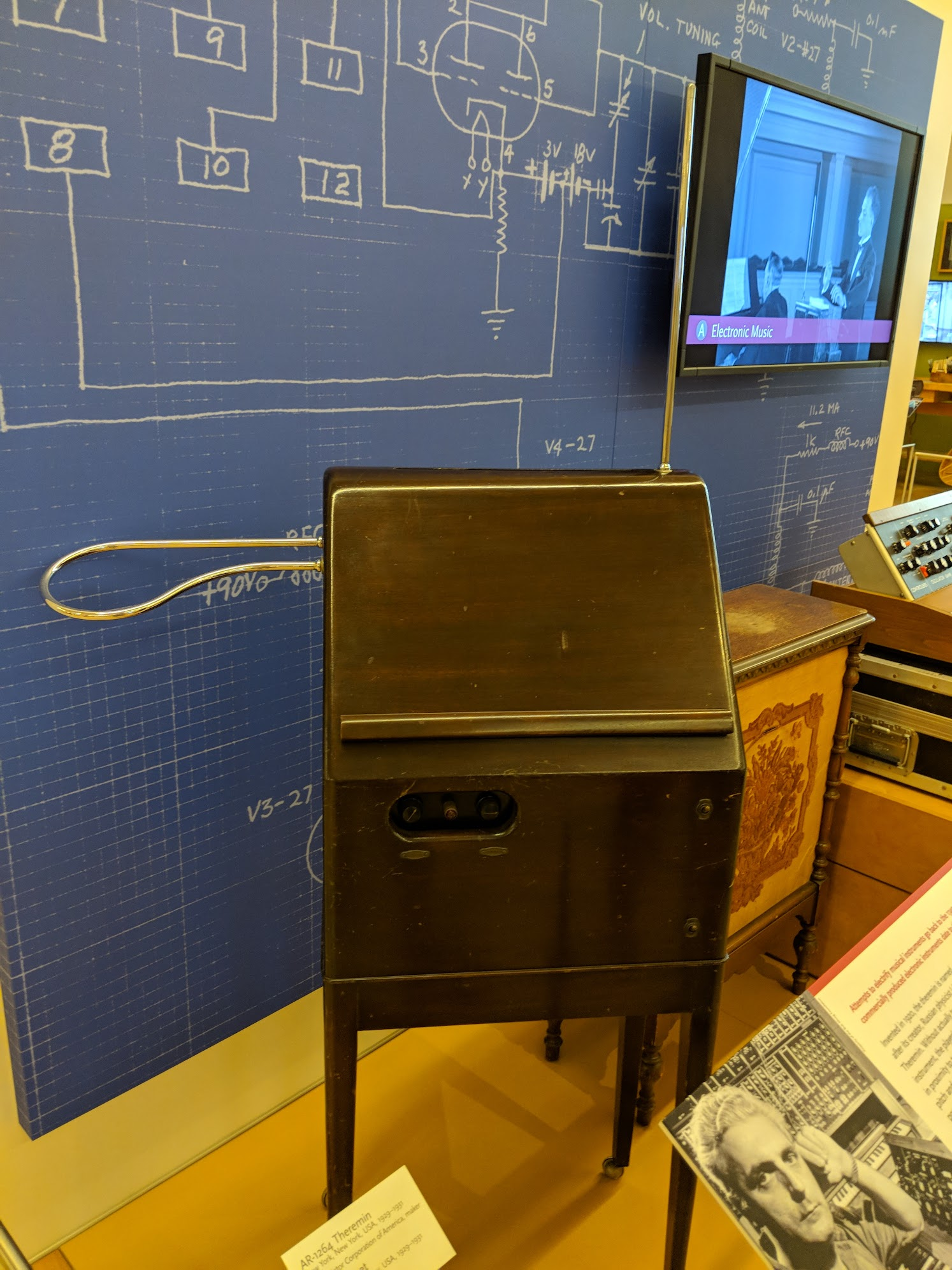
Theremin, RCA AR-1264, USA

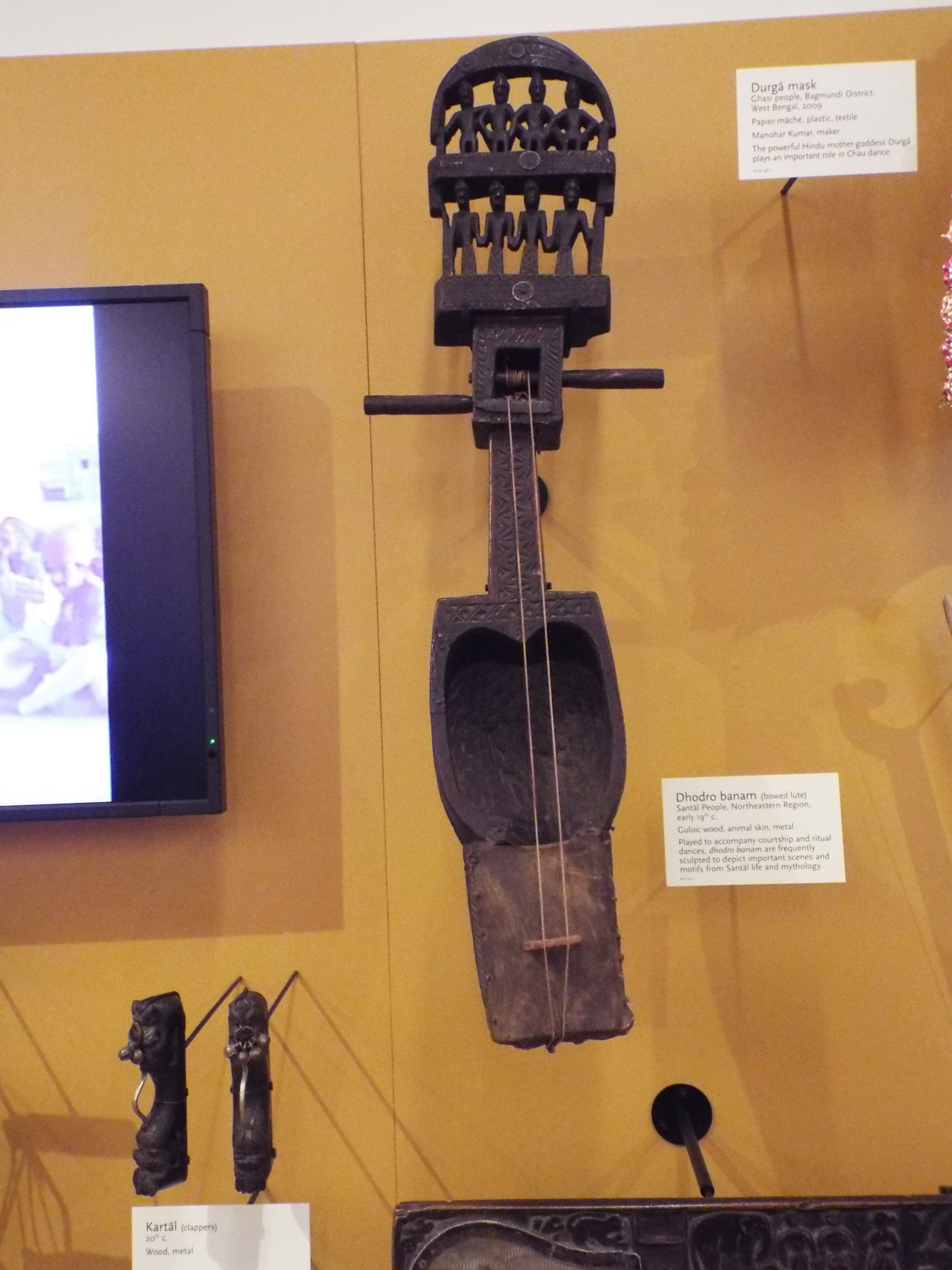
A Dhodro Banam (1800) from Nepal

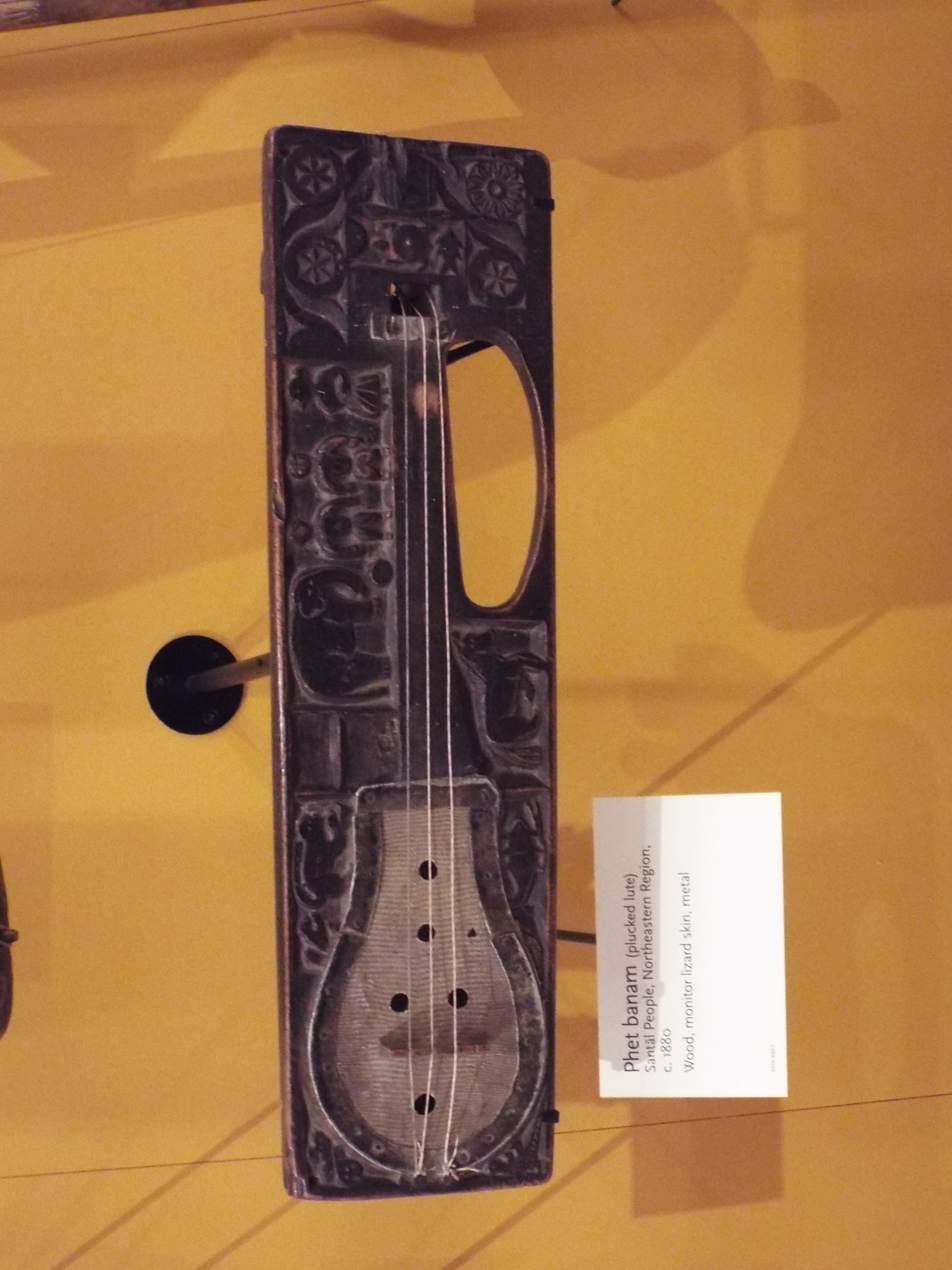
A Phet Banam (1880) from Nepal

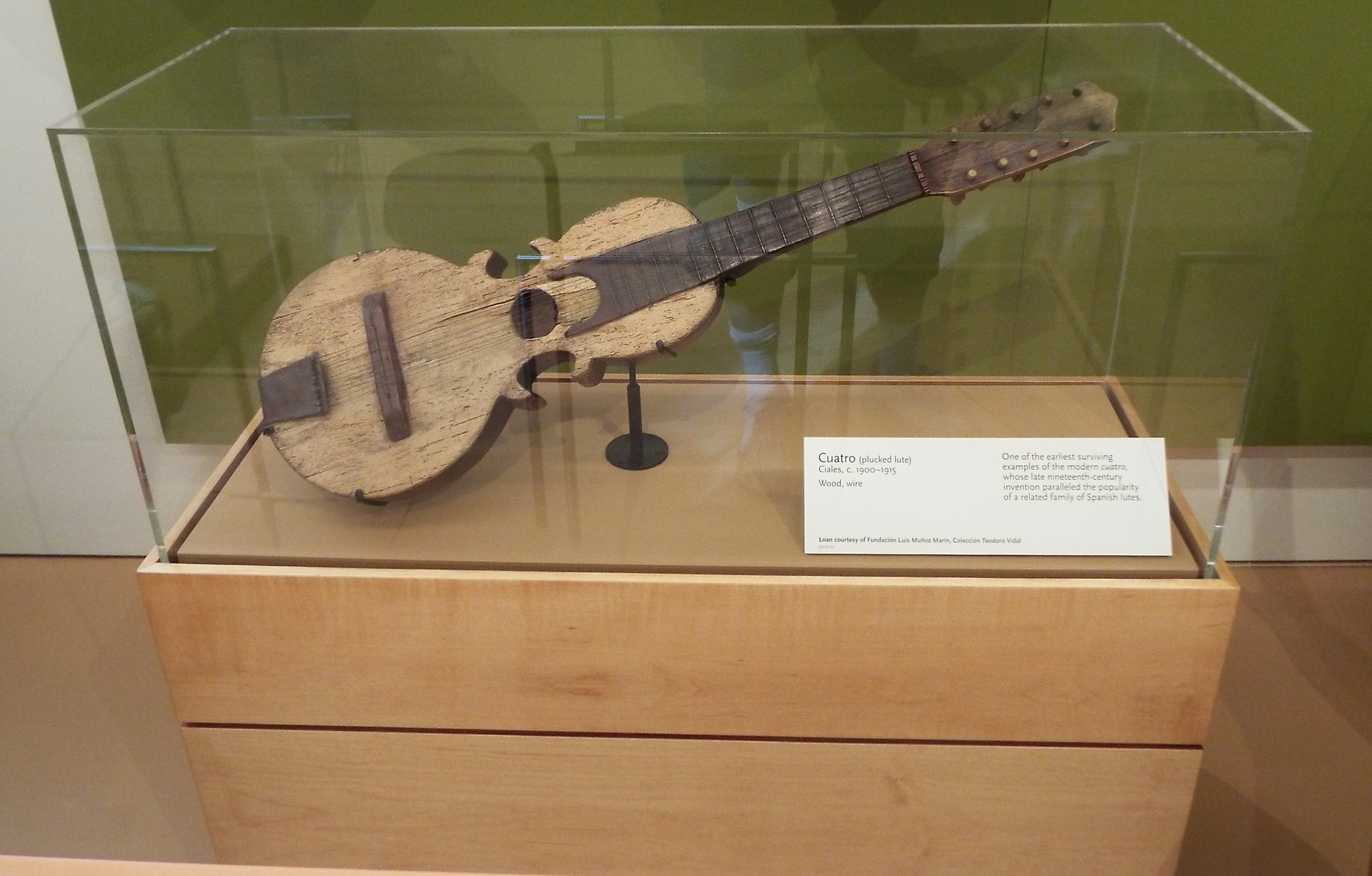
A Cuatro (c. 1900–1915) from Ciales, Puerto Rico

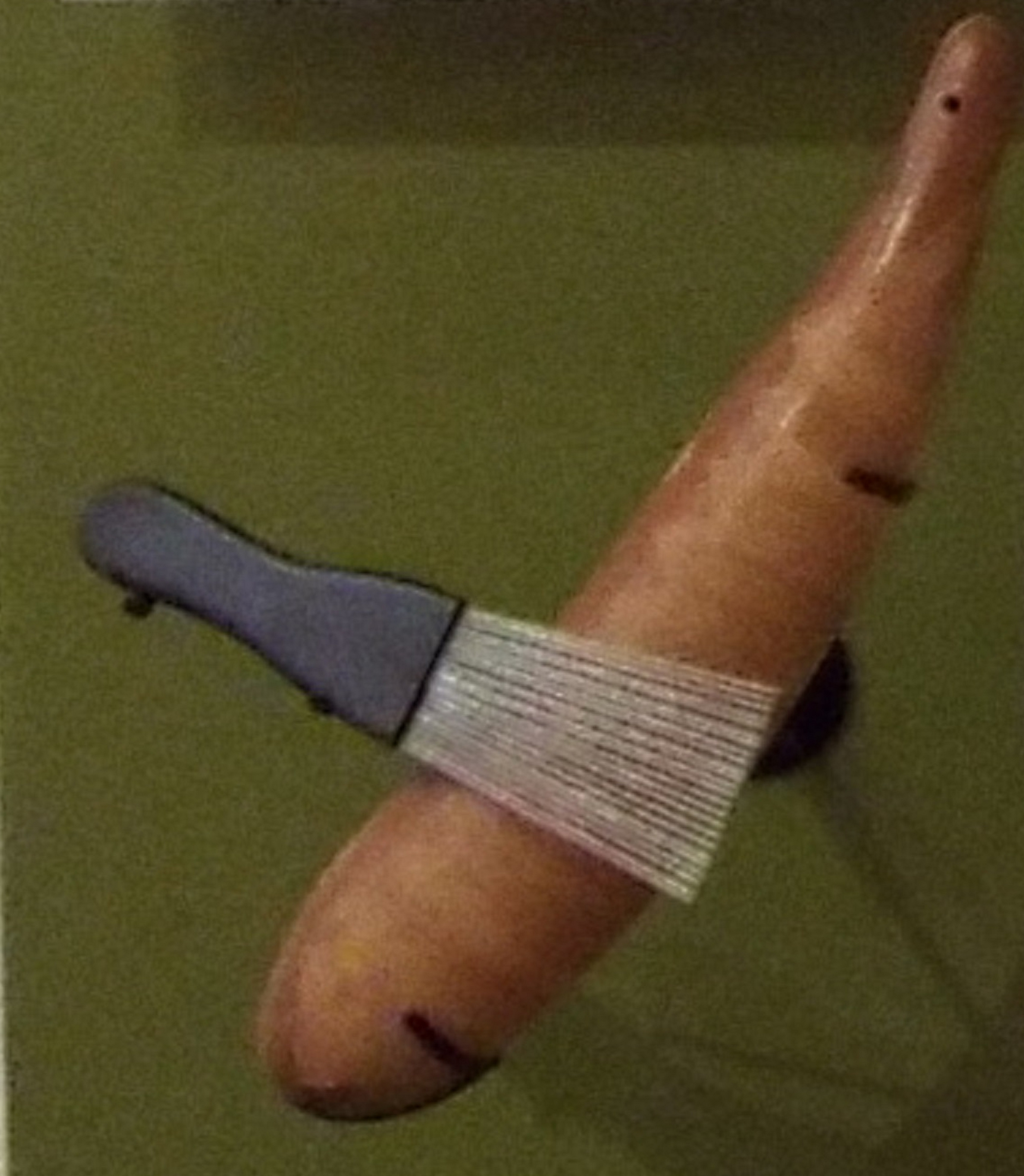
A Puerto Rican Güiro

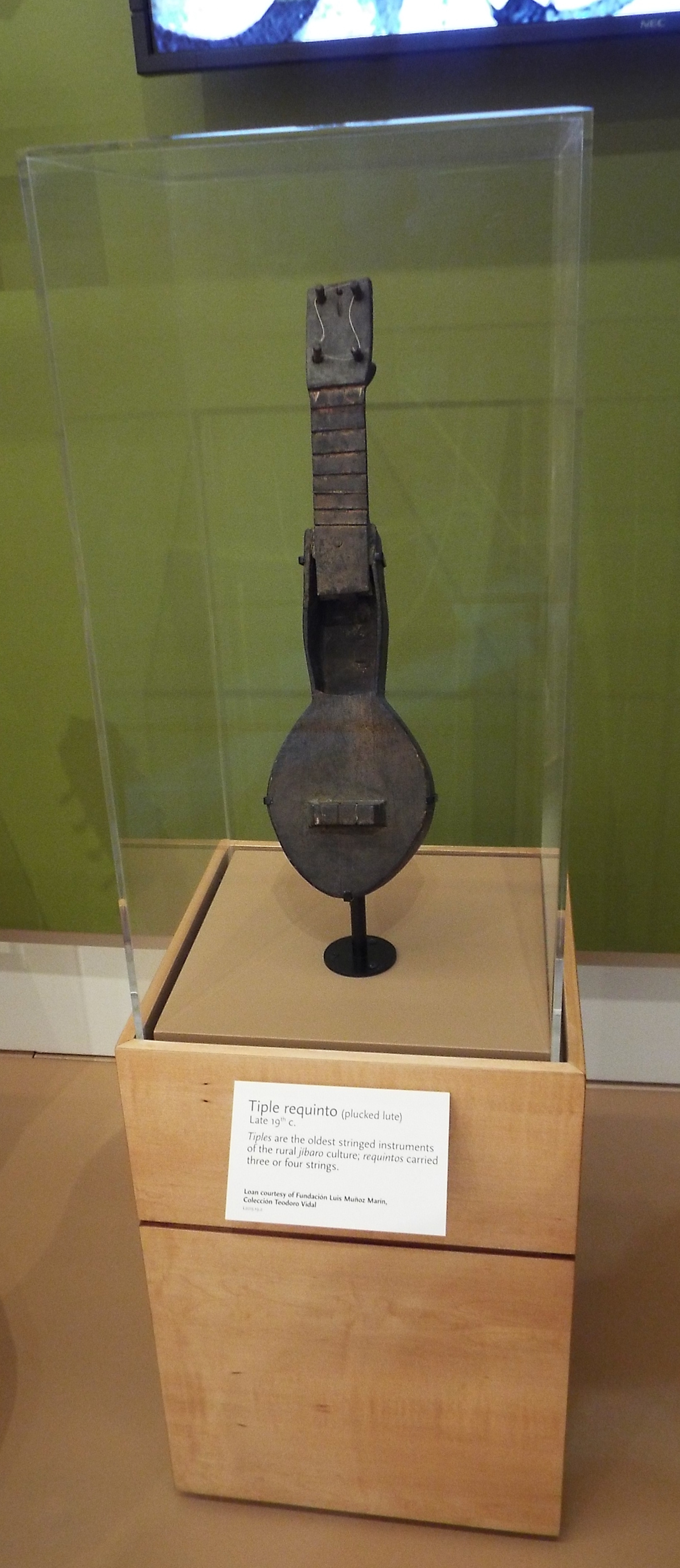
A Tiple Requinto (1880) from Puerto Rico

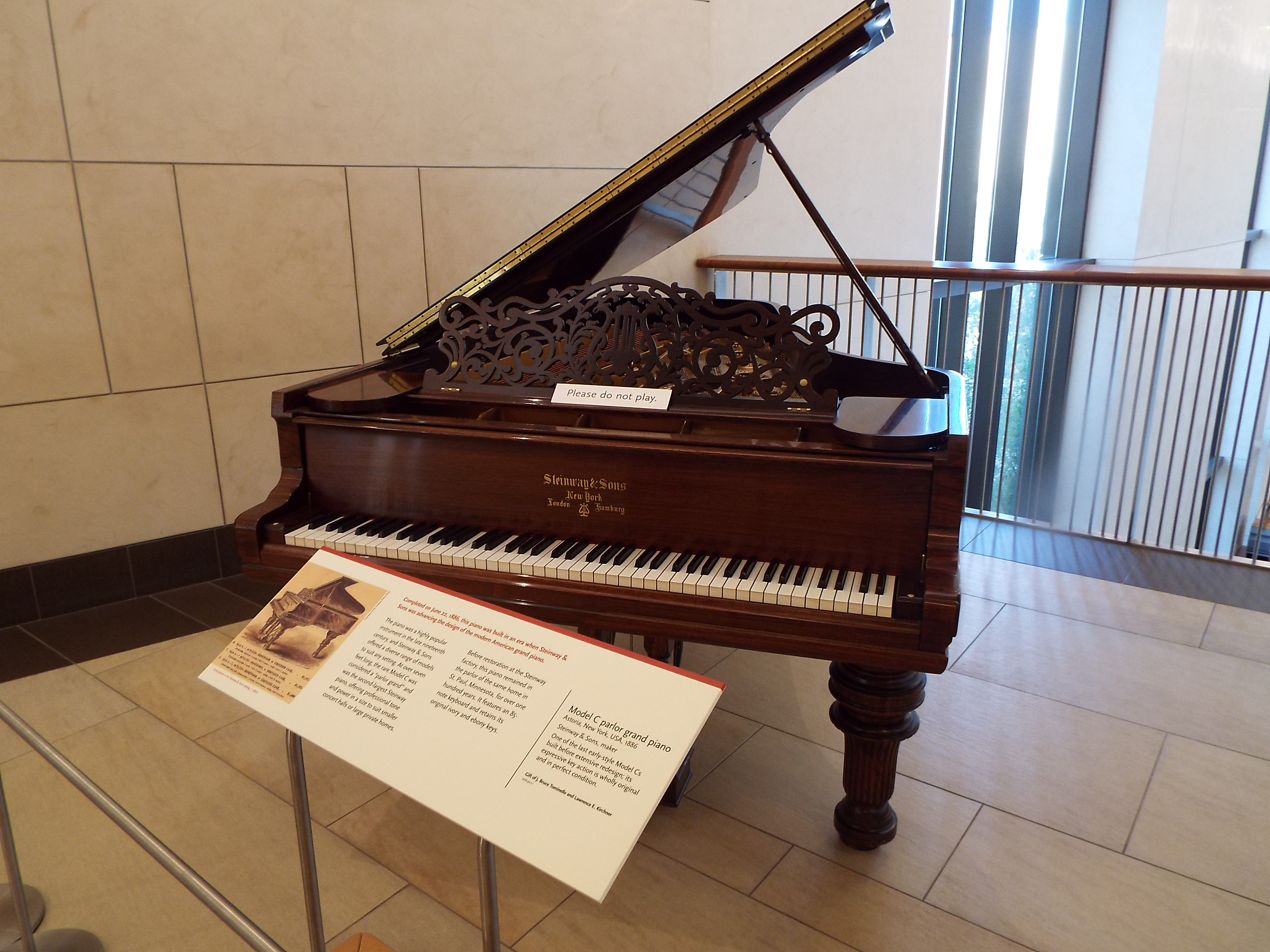
A Model C Parlor Grand Piano (1886) from the United States

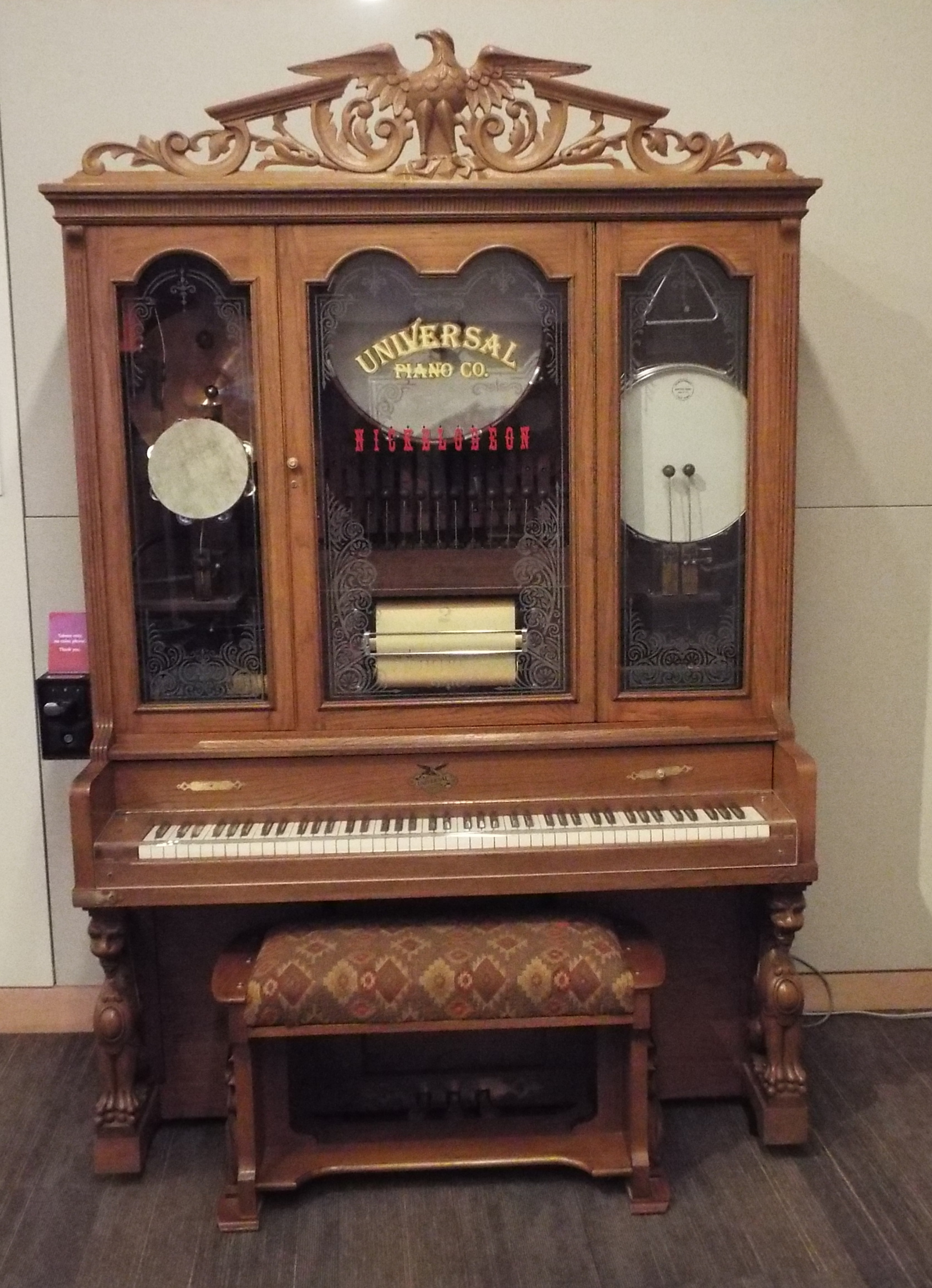
A Nickelodean Piano Player from the United States

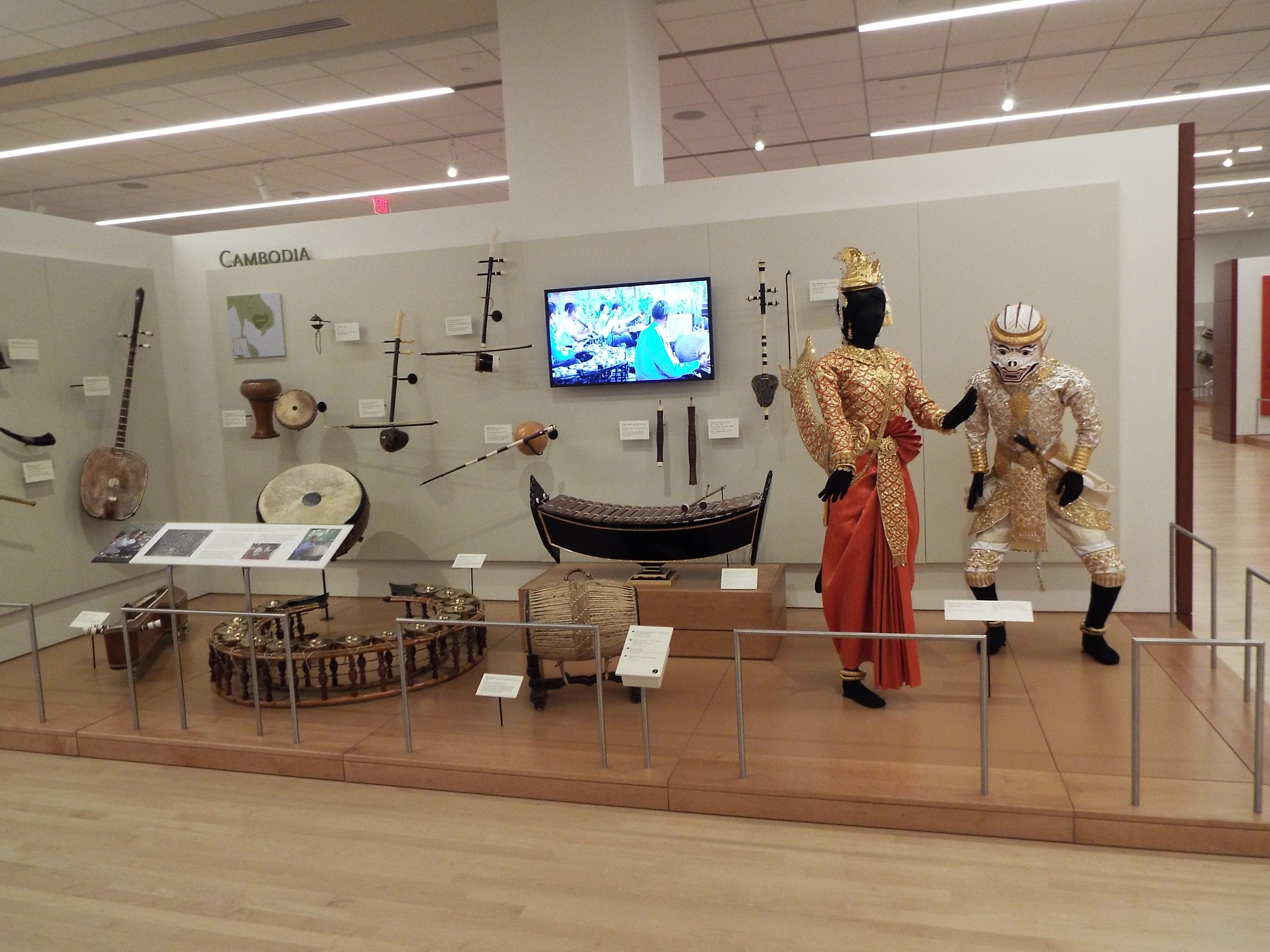
Cambodia exhibit

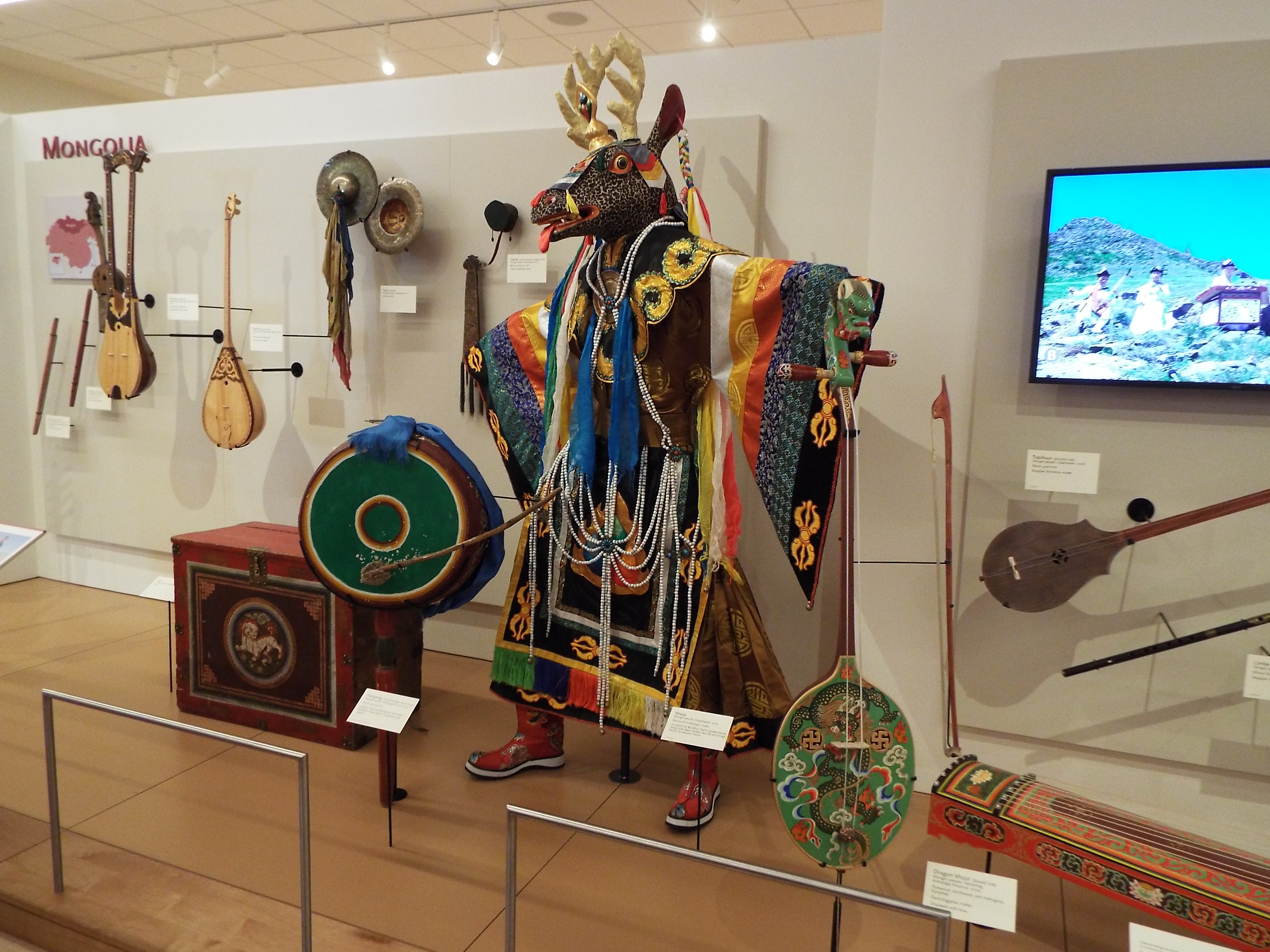
Mongolia exhibit. The costume depicts the underworld deity Erlik Khan.

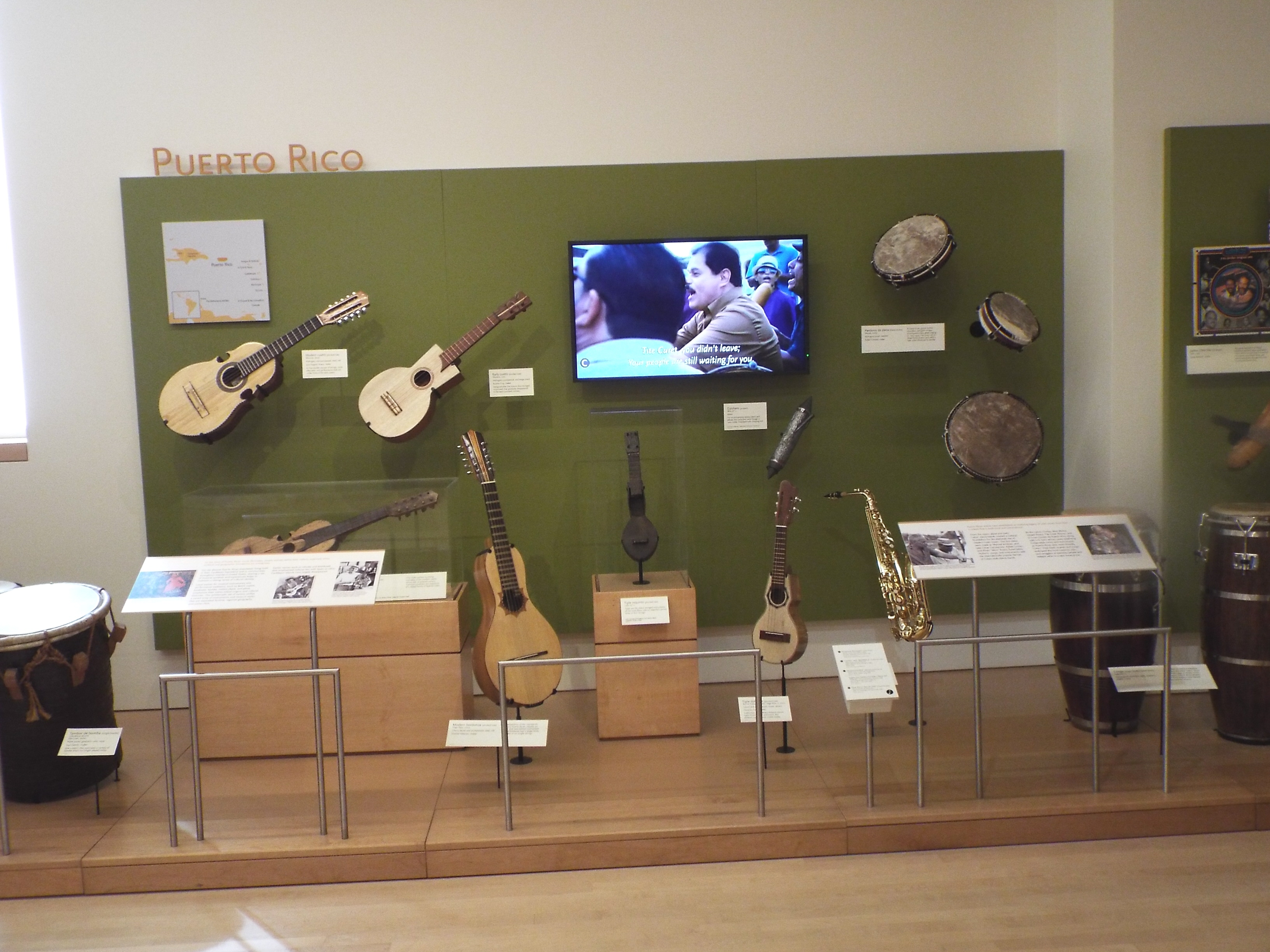
Puerto Rico exhibit

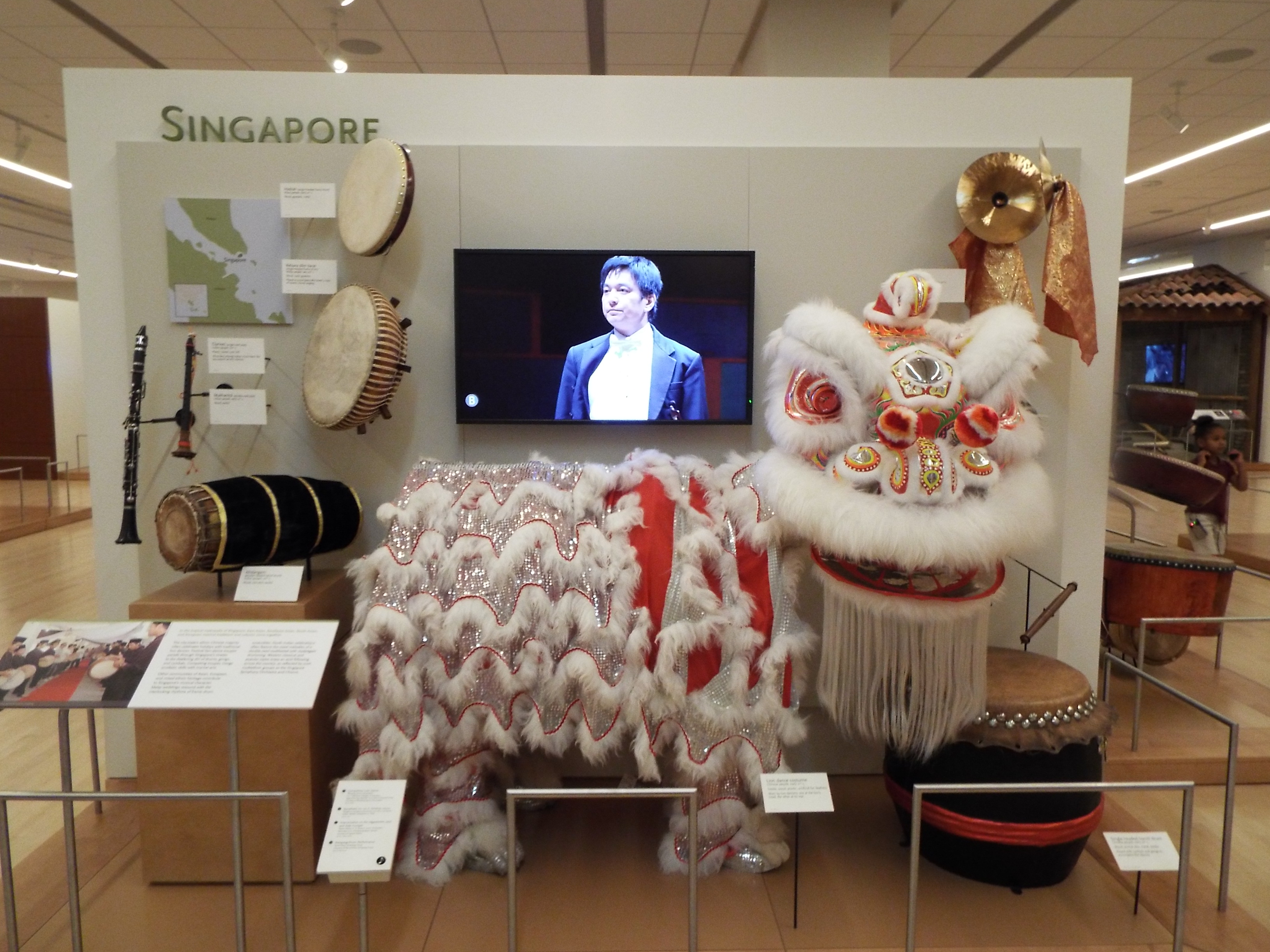
Singapore exhibit

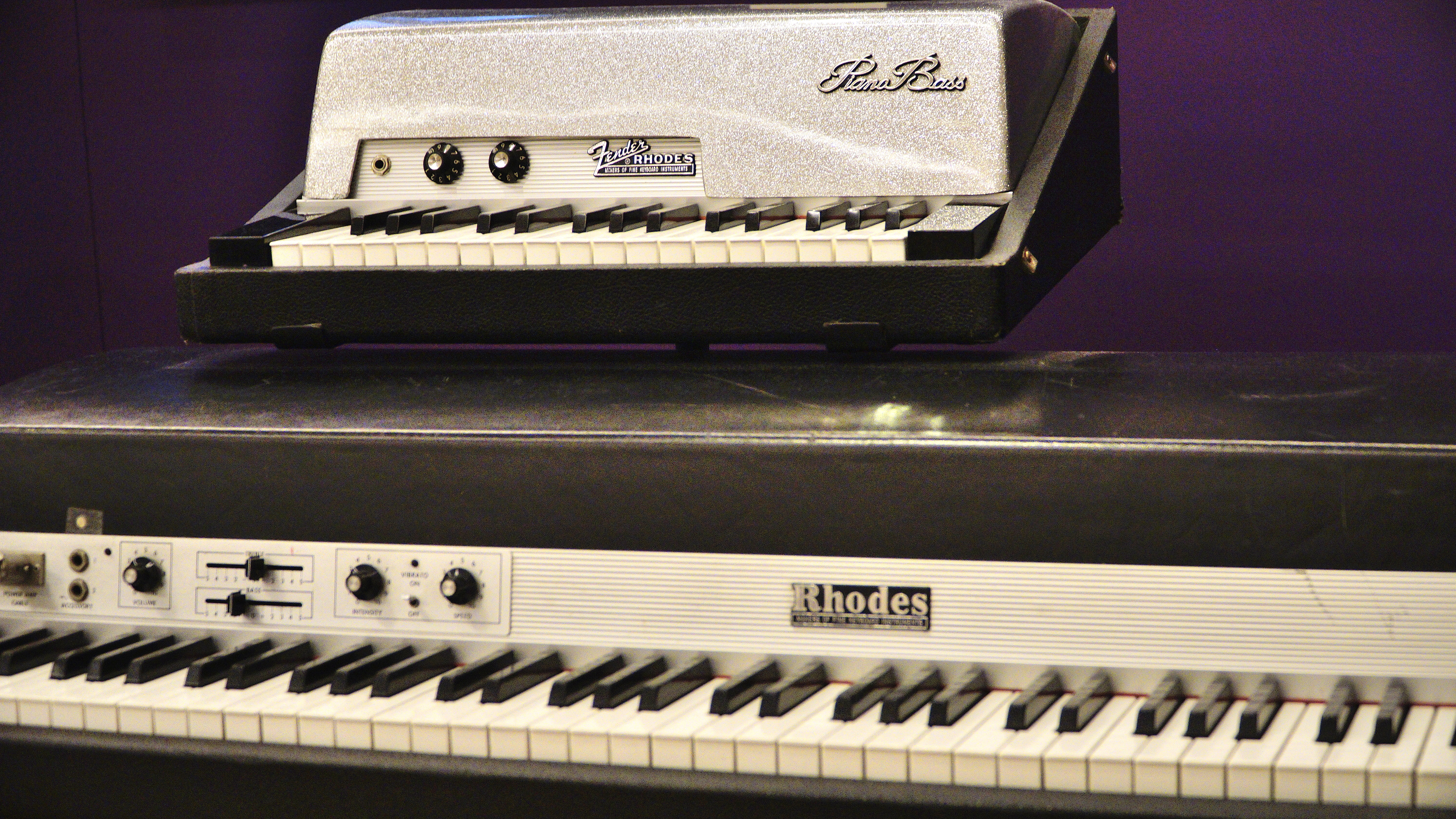
Fender/Rhodes keyboard – USA exhibit

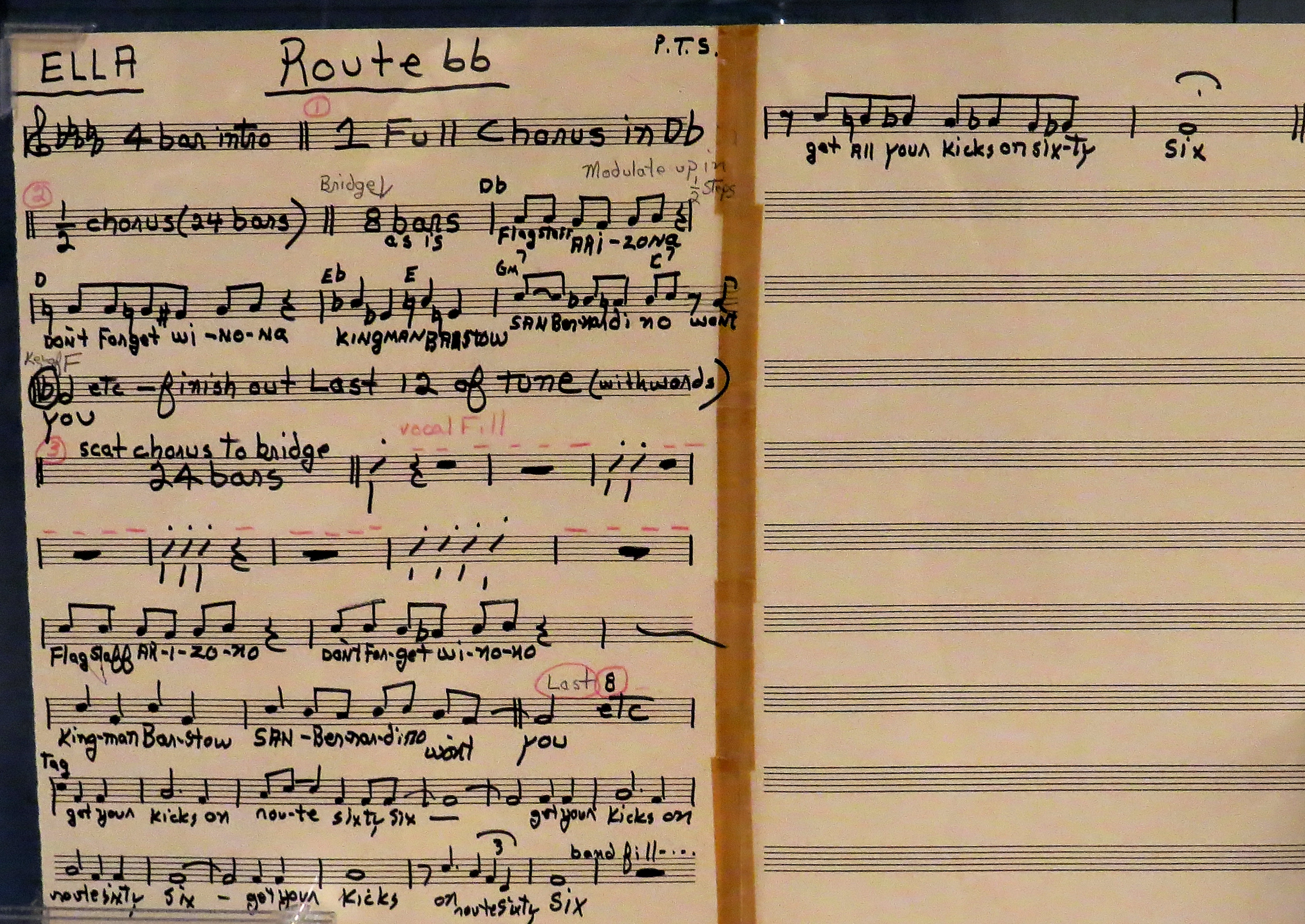
Ella Fitzgerald sheet music for Route 66 – USA exhibit

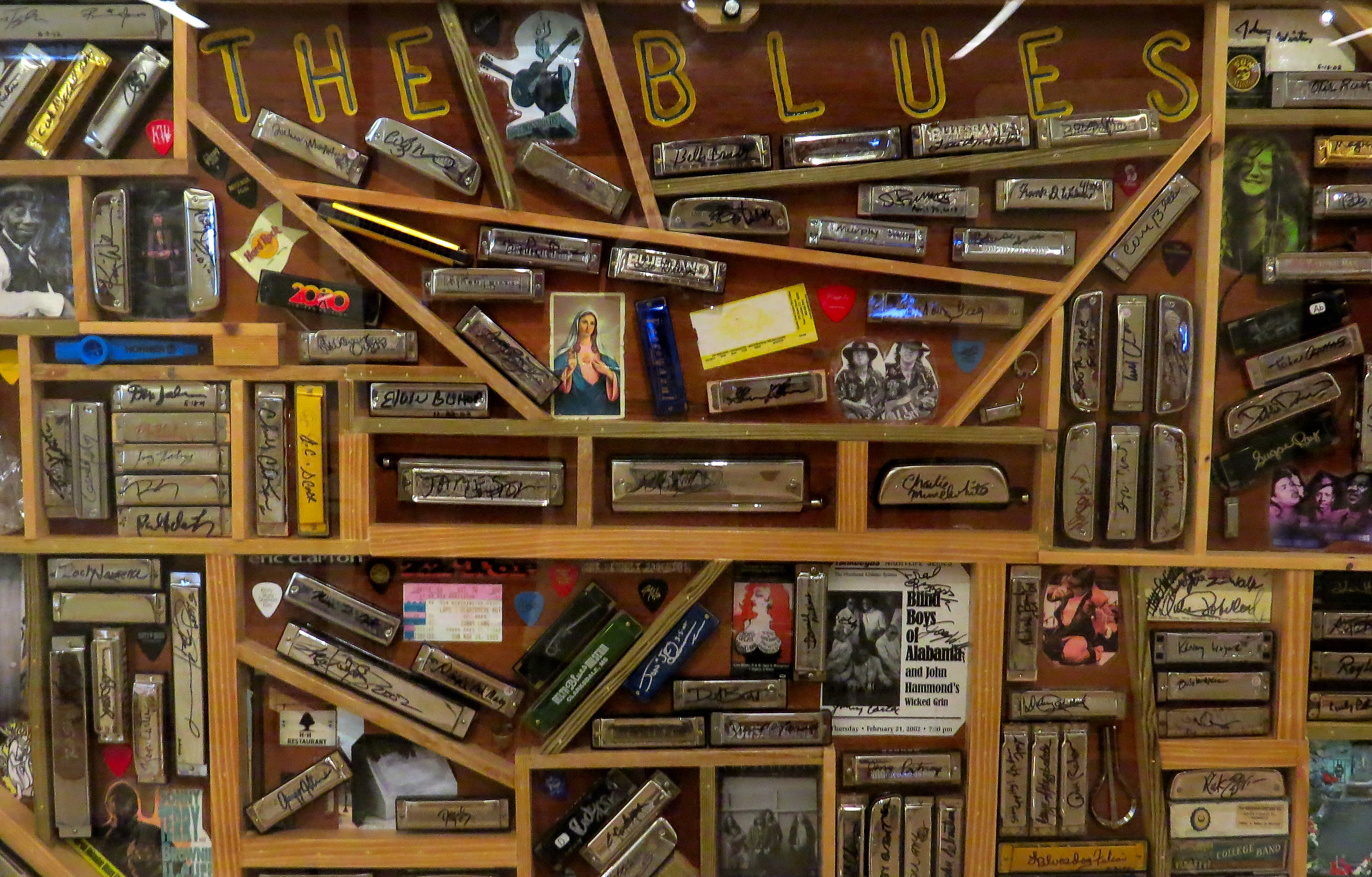
Autographed harmonica collection – USA exhibit

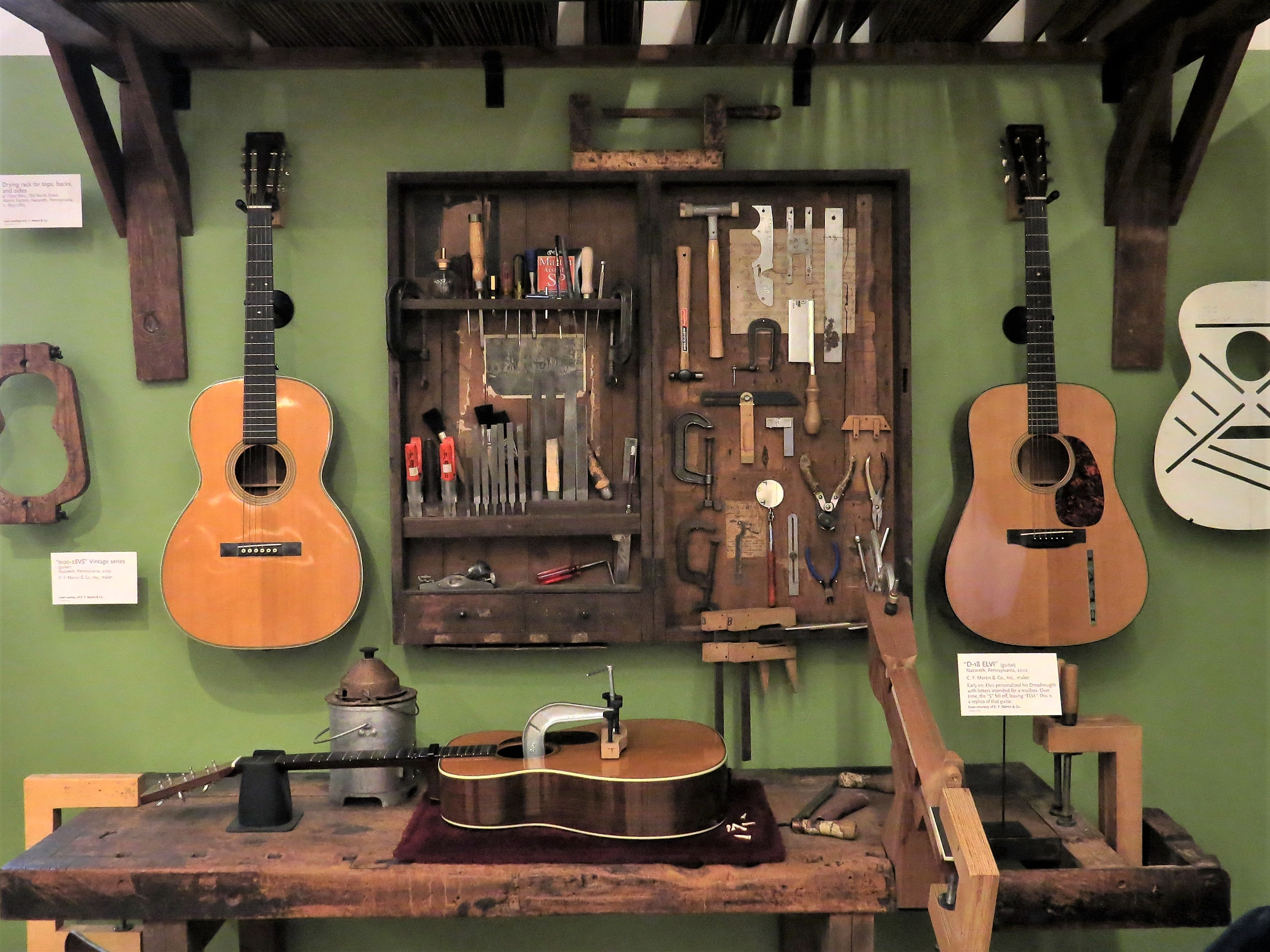
Martin guitar shop – USA exhibit

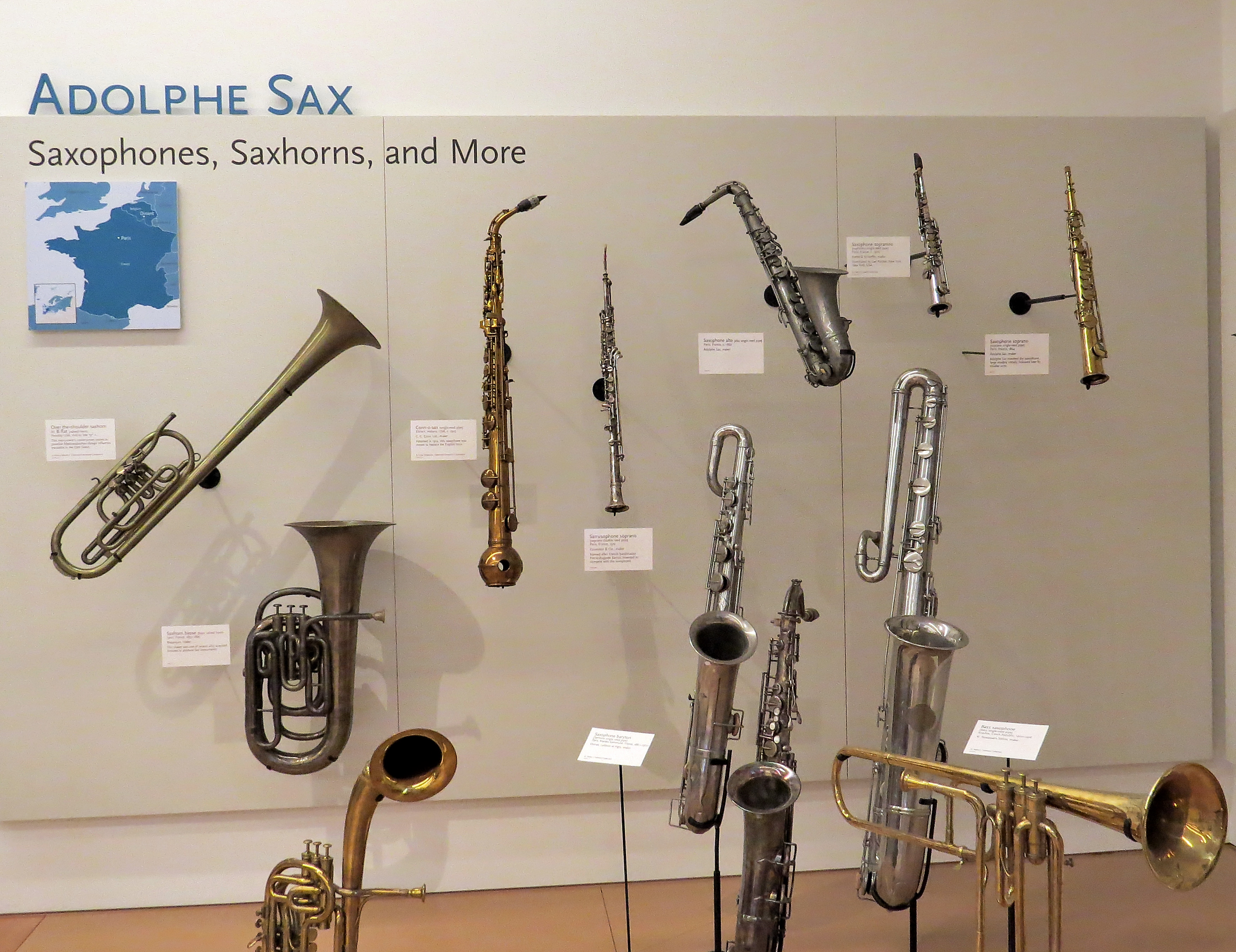
Sax family of instruments – Europe exhibit

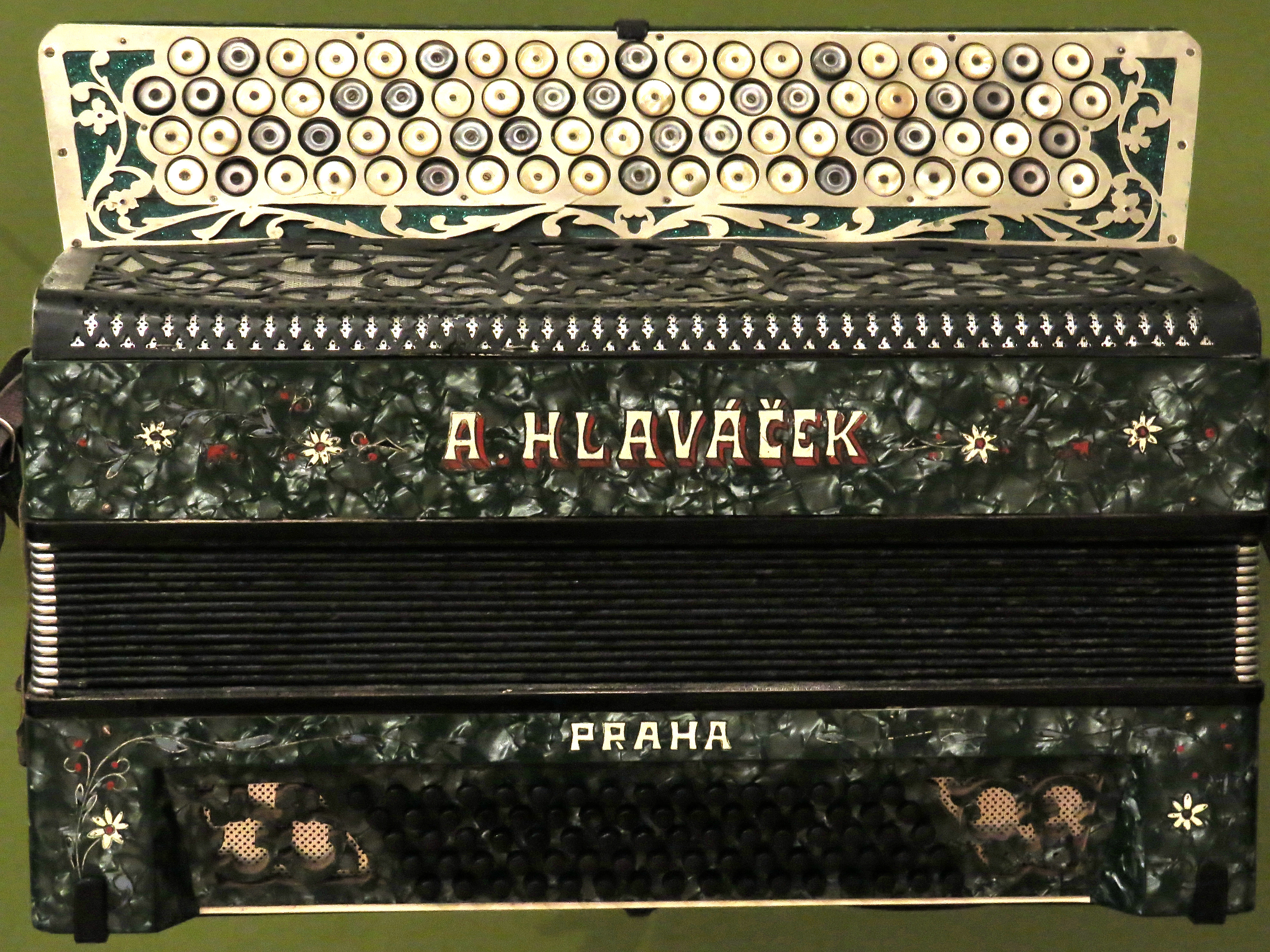
Czech accordion – Europe exhibit

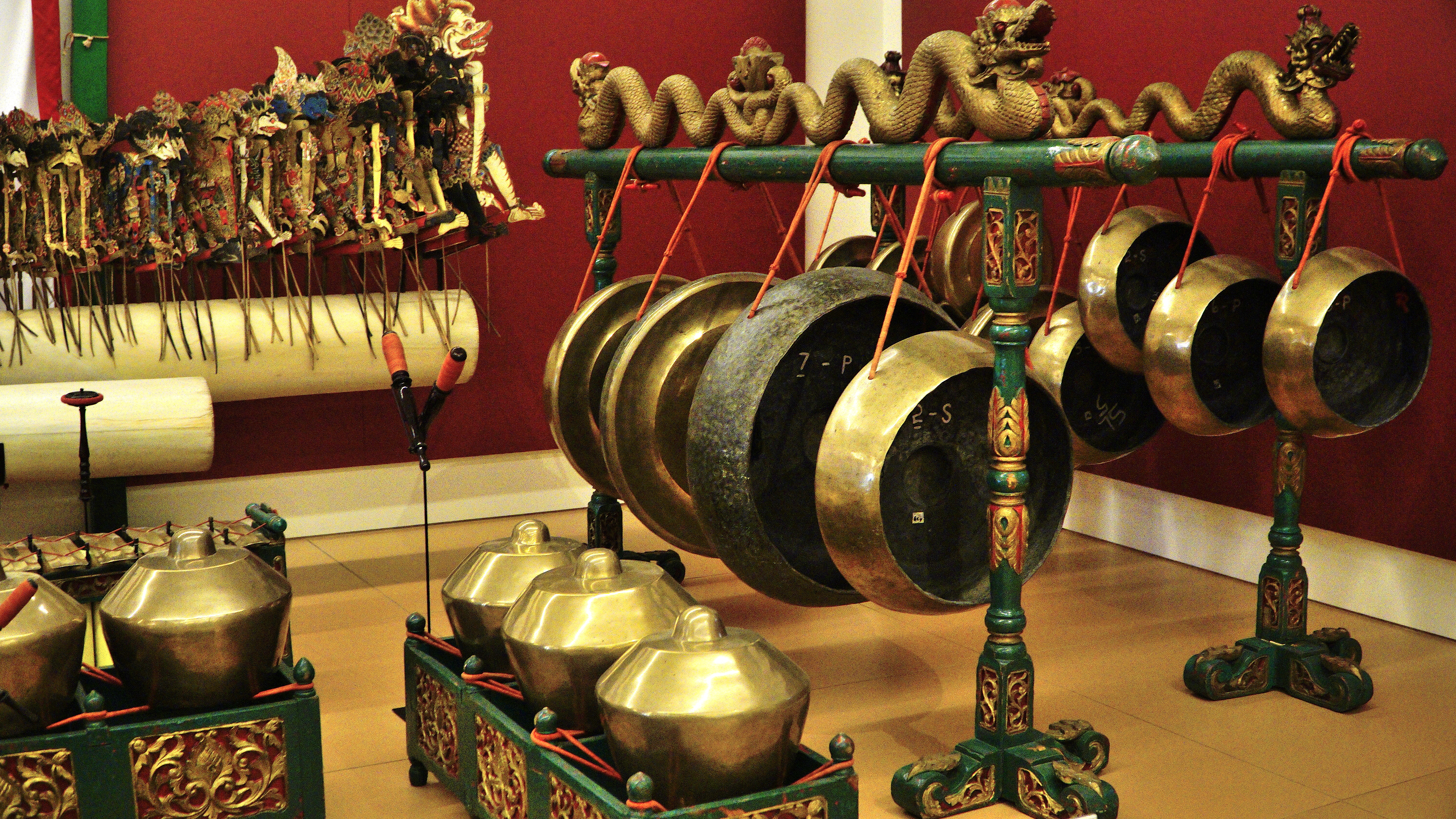
Gong collection – Asia exhibit

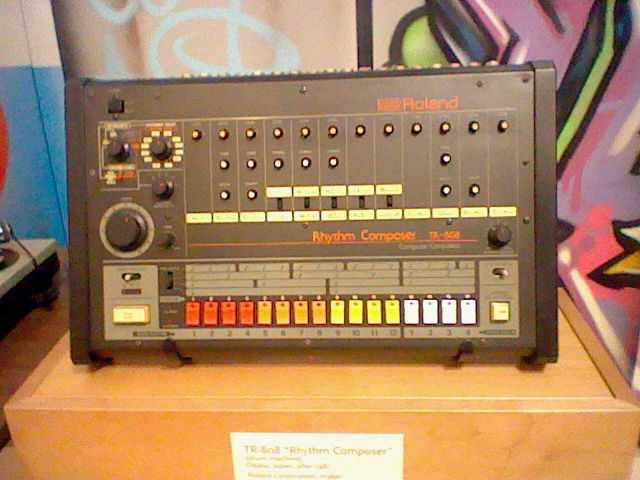
Roland TR-808 from the United States

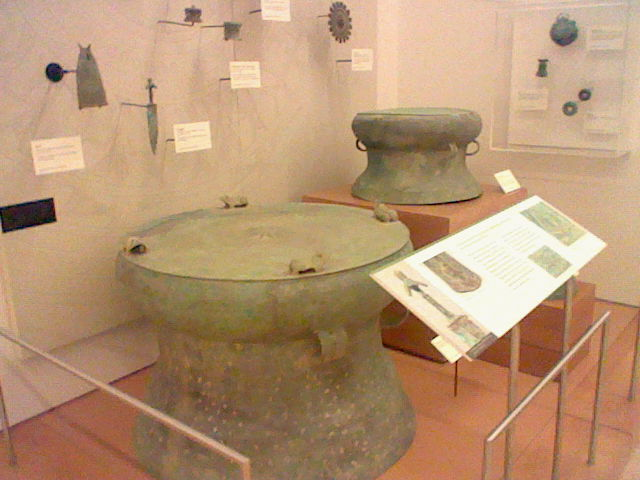
Ancient Vietnamese drums and other percussion instruments

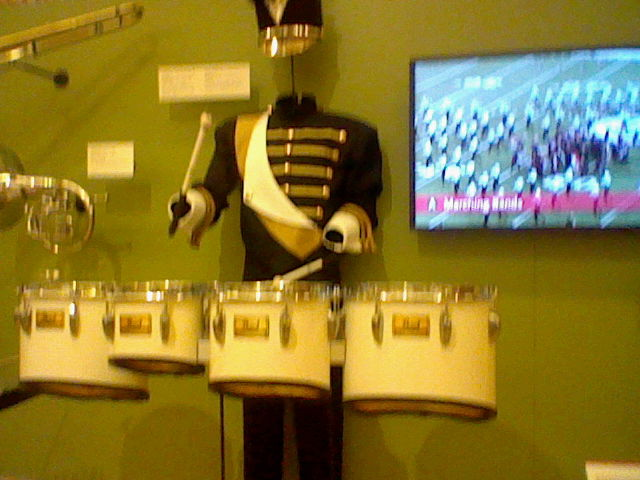
United States marching exhibit

The Artist Gallery of the Musical Instrumental Museum of Phoenix is where visitors can see the clothes worn by many singers. They can also see and hear the original instruments played by Elvis Presley, Roy Orbison, Johnny Cash, John Lennon, Carlos Santana, Tito Puente, Taylor Swift and many other artists from around the world.

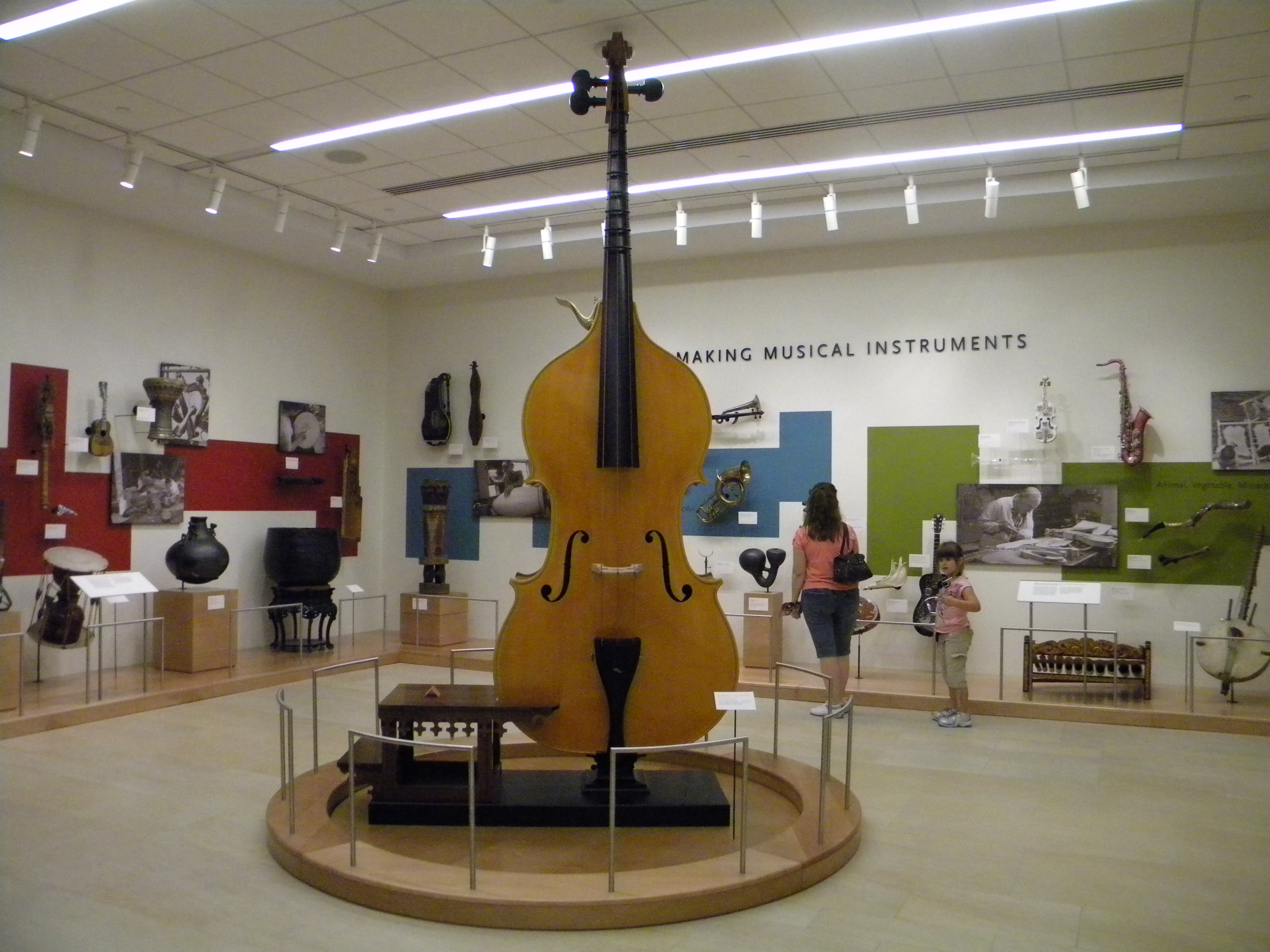
The octobass at the Musical Instrument Museum (MIM) in Phoenix, AZ, is a rare, 12-foot-tall, three-stringed instrument from around 1850

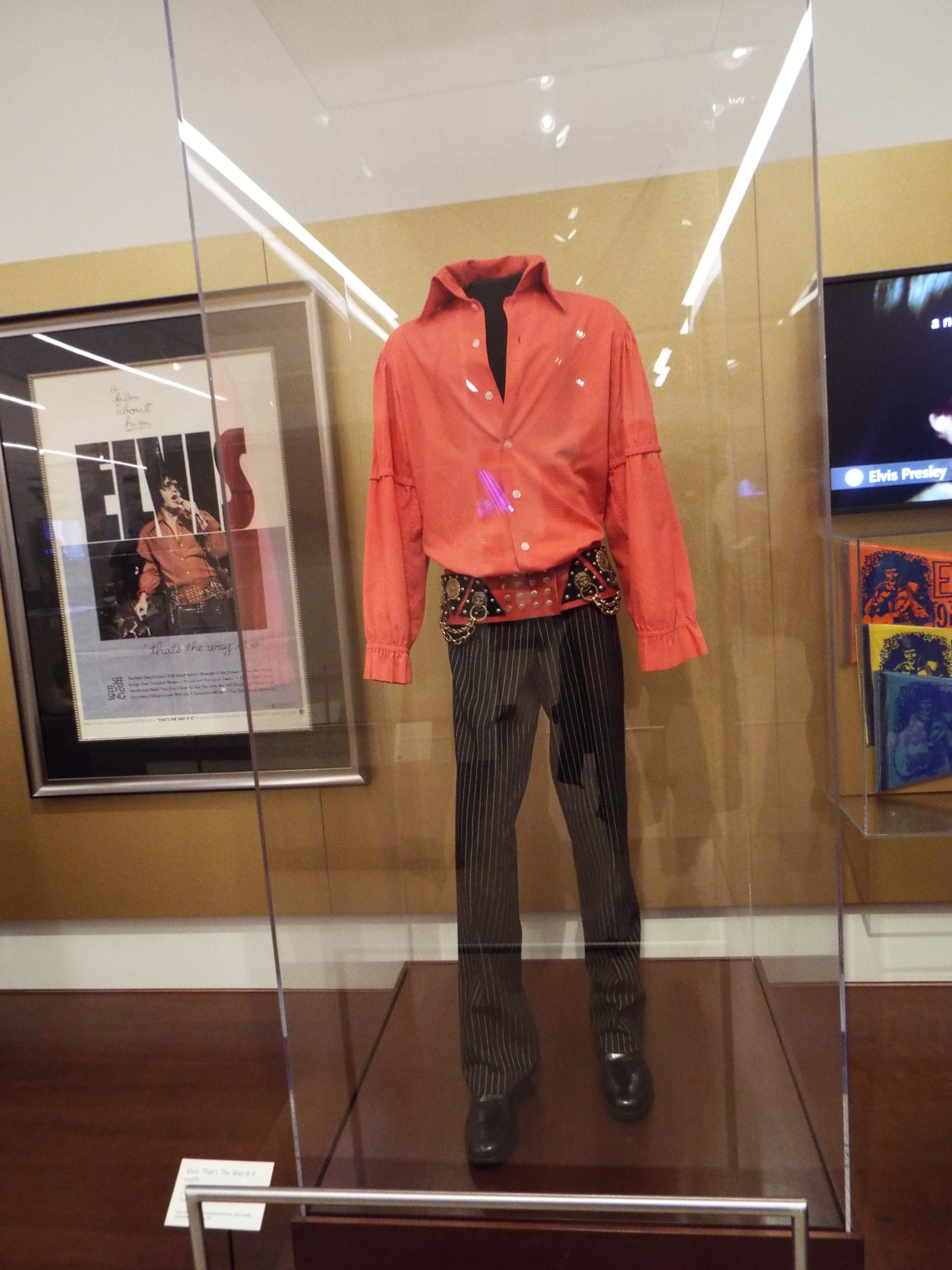
Clothes worn by Elvis Presley

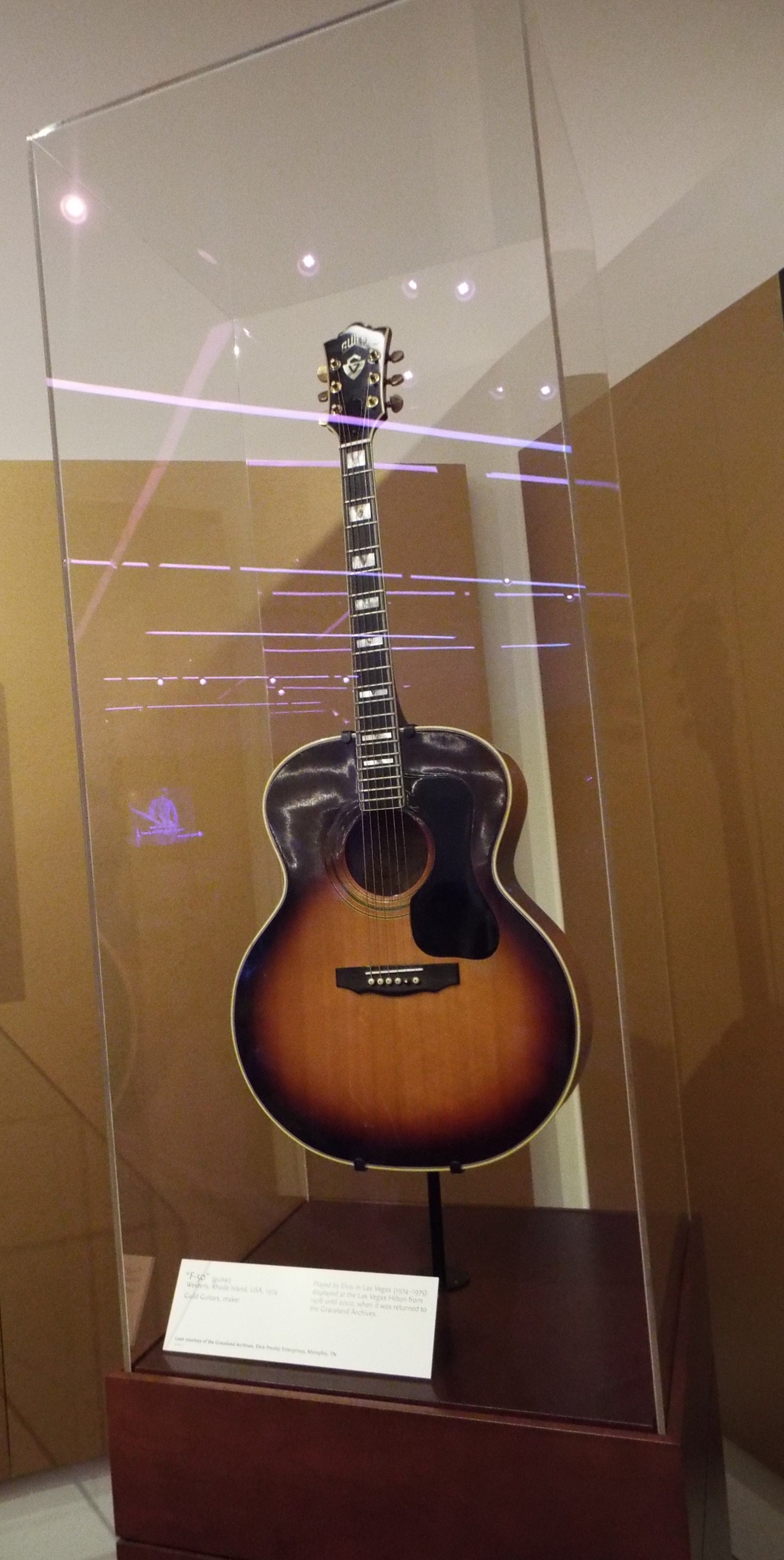
Elvis’ guitar

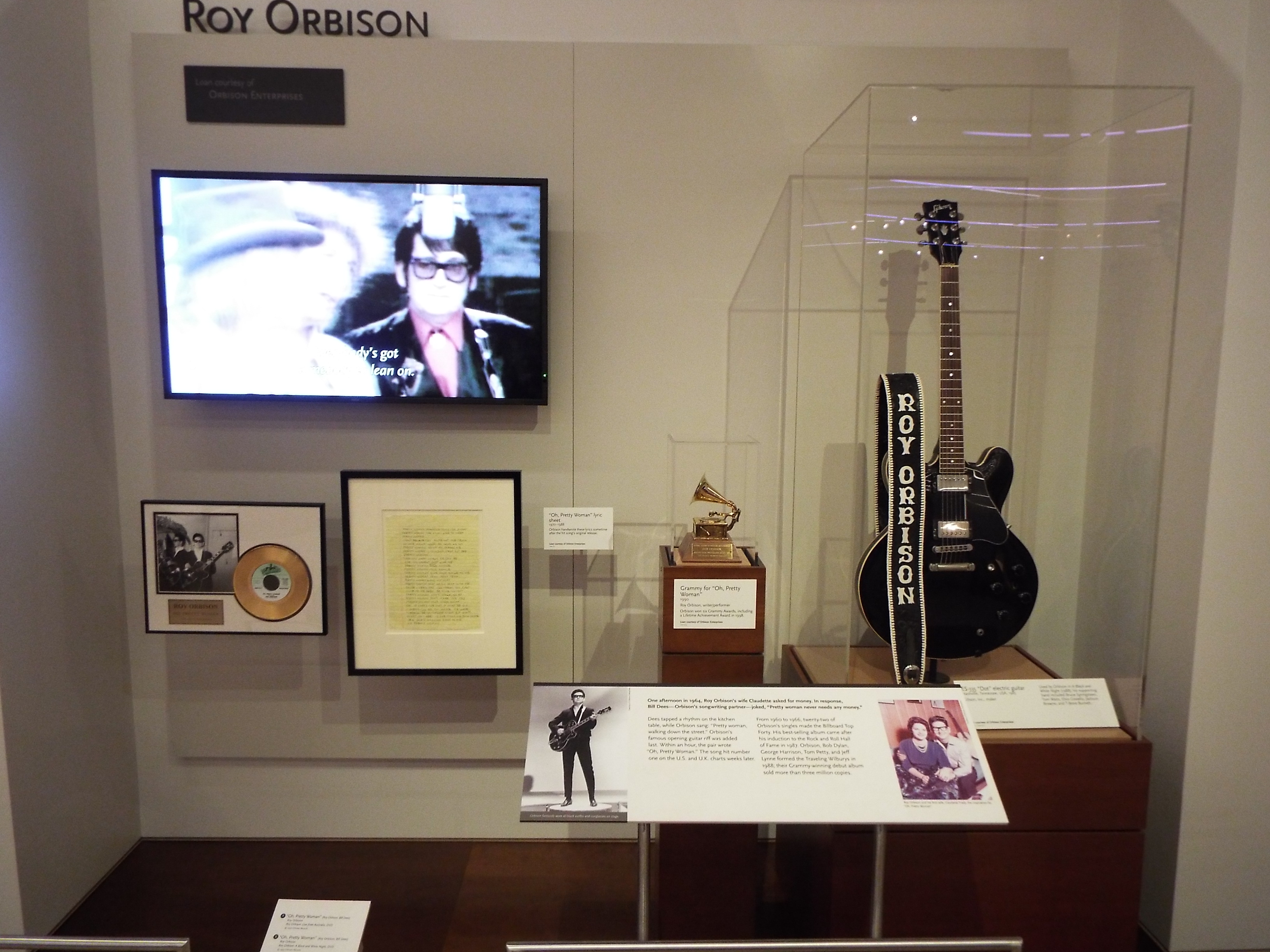
The Roy Orbison exhibit

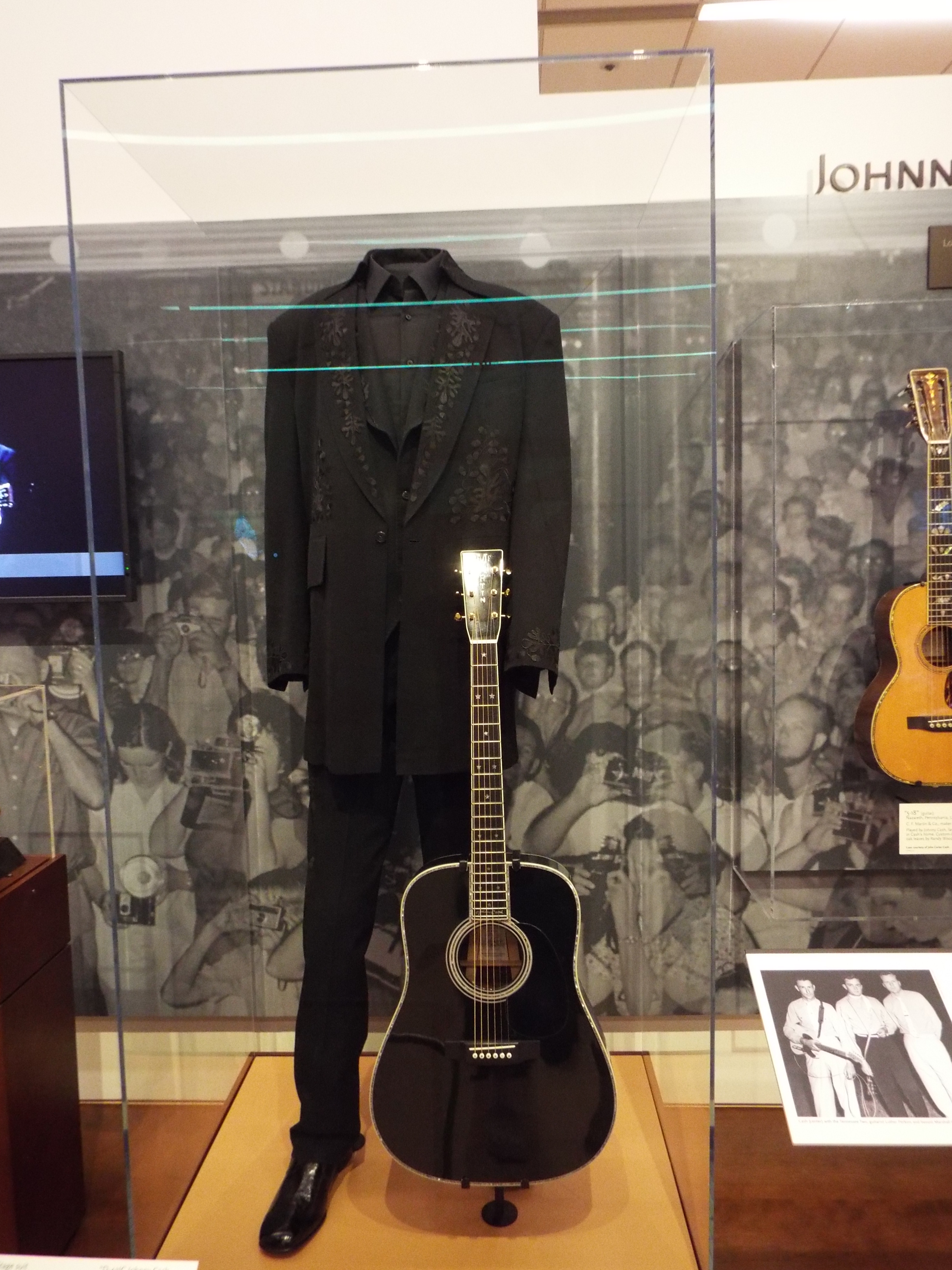
The clothes and guitar of Johnny Cash on exhibit

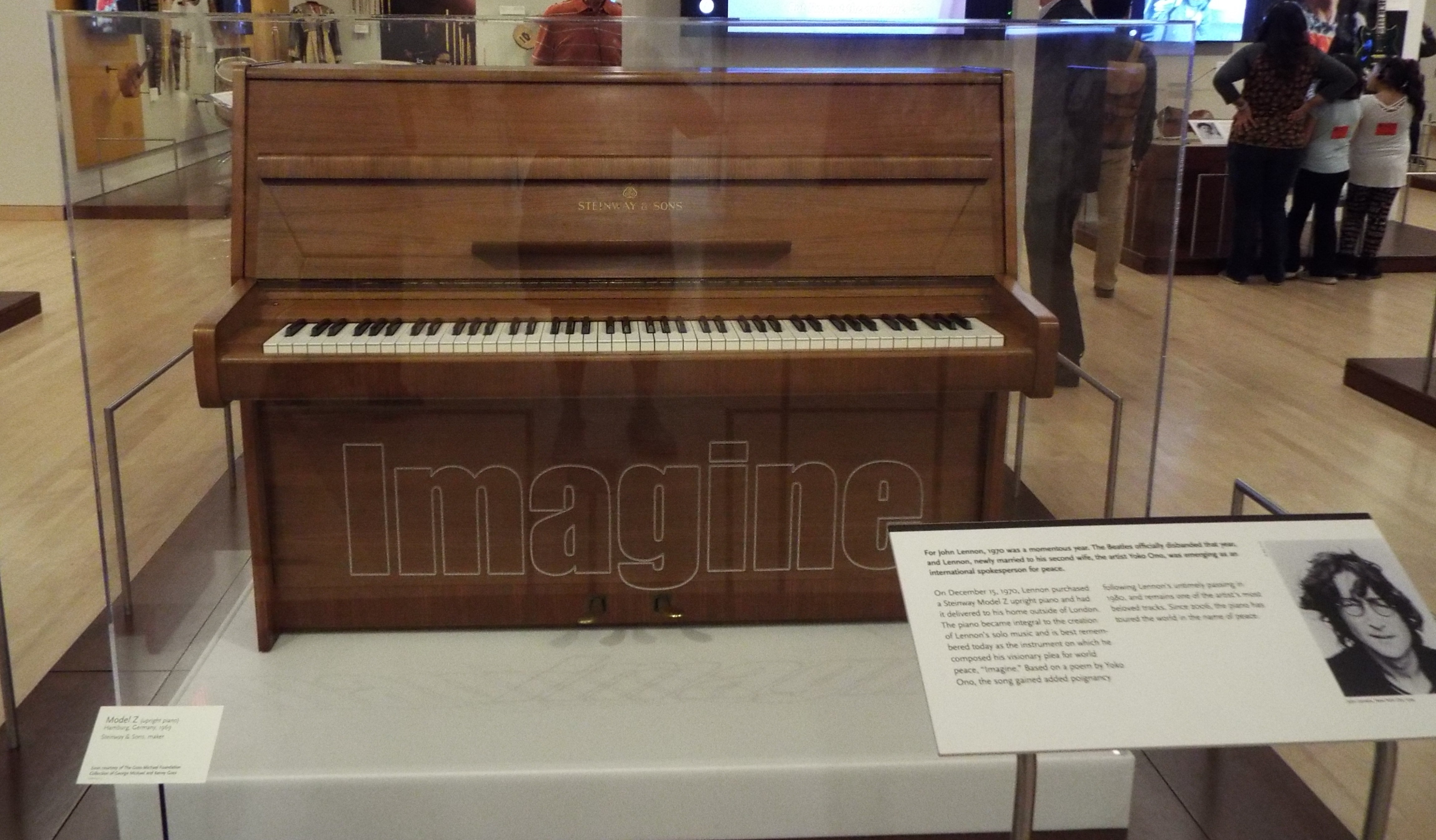
The Steinway piano that John Lennon used to compose the song "Imagine"

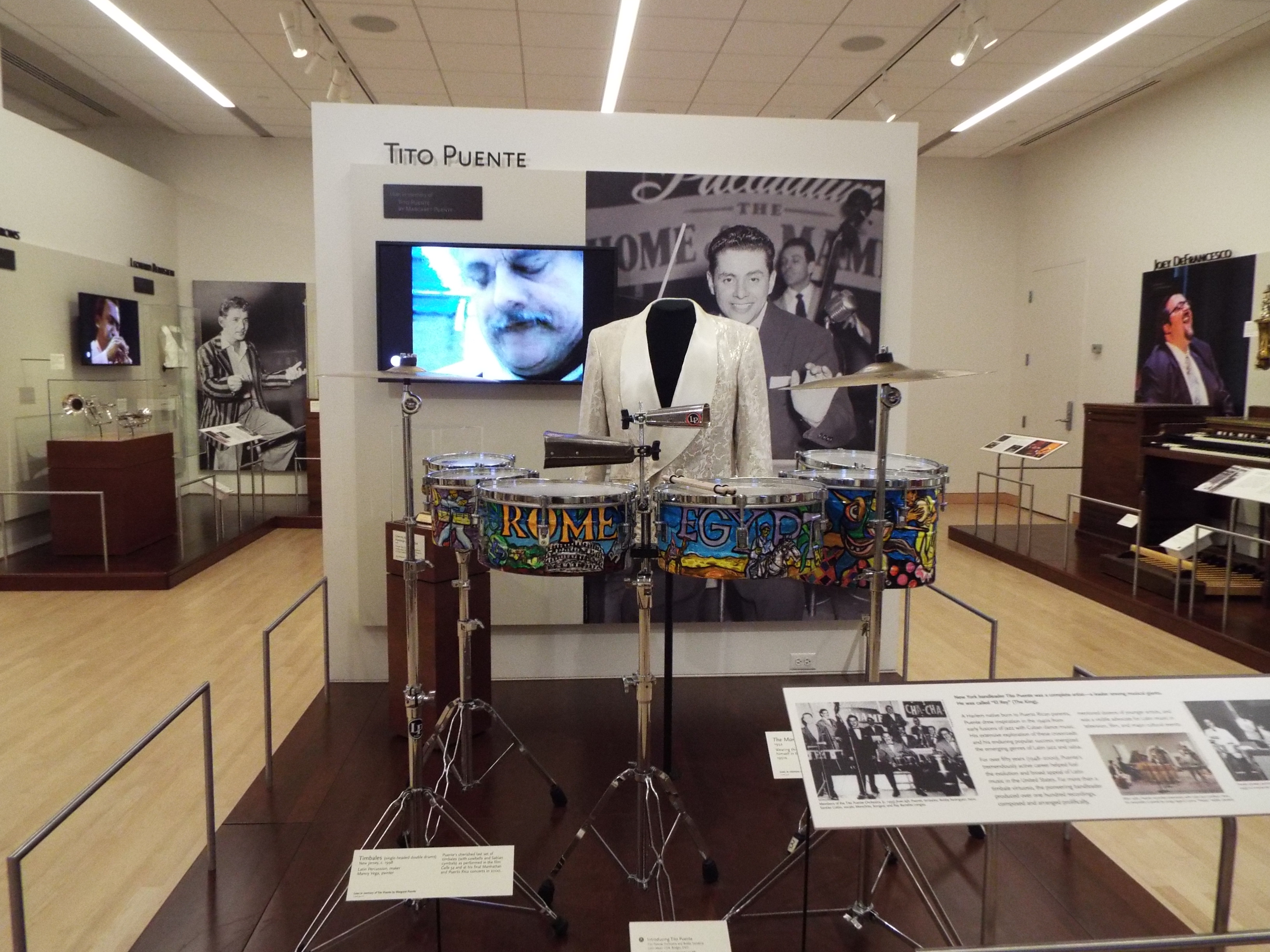
Tito Puente’s timbales on exhibit

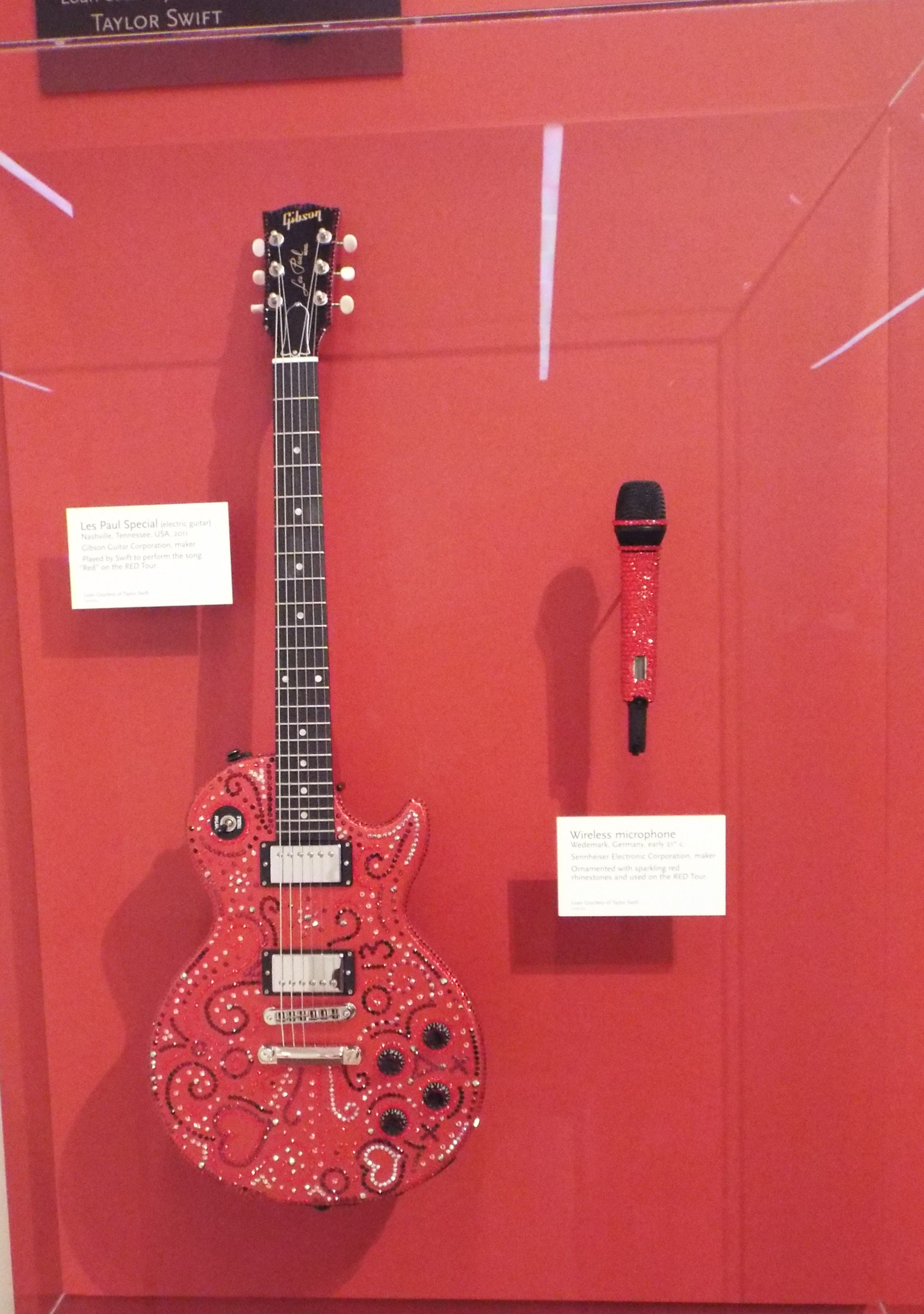
Taylor Swift’s "Les Paul" guitar and cordless microphone

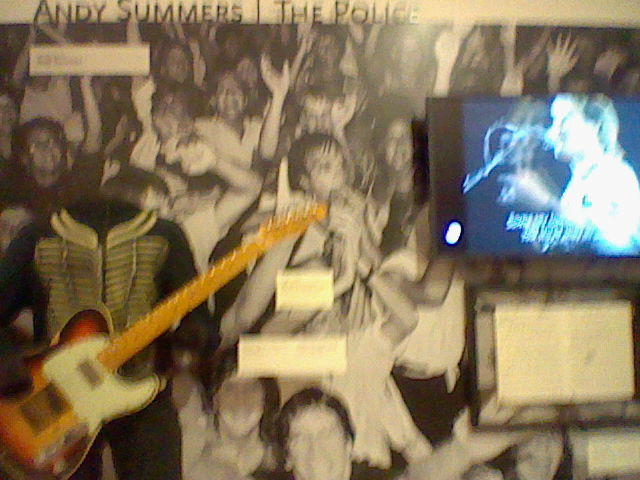
Andy Summers guitar & stage outfit

== See also ==
- Musical Instrument Museum (disambiguation)
- List of music museums

== Bibliography ==
- Lewis, Randy (April 18, 2010), "Beating the drum for Phoenix's Musical Instrument Museum", L.A. Times
