= Timeline of Basel =

Coordinates: 47.566667°N 7.6°E

The following is a timeline of the history of the city of Basel (or Basle, in the once-preferred English spelling).

Established in the 4th century, the city rose to importance in the medieval period as a bishop's seat. In the 15th century it became an important center of Renaissance humanism and, in the 16th century, of the Protestant Reformation. Basel joined the Swiss Confederacy in 1501. In the 19th century, Basel was a center of Industrialisation, and it remains one of the major cities of contemporary Switzerland.

== Early history ==
- 150 BC – Settlement of the Gaulish Rauraci on the northwestern outskirts of the present city
- 58 BC
  - Rauraci together with Helvetii try to emigrate to Gaul, but are defeated at the Battle of Bibracte by Julius Caesar and sent back to their homeland
  - Returning Rauraci build a fortified settlement, called oppidum (located in today's Basel Cathedral hill)
- c. 44 BC – Augusta Raurica is founded by the Romans some 5 km from the site of the future city.
- c. 15 BC – Successful colonization of the area supported by the Augustus's conquest of the central Alps
- 2nd C. AD
  - Augusta Raurica becomes a prosperous commercial trading centre and the capital of a local Roman province
  - Population reaches approximately twenty thousand people
- 250 AD – Powerful earthquake damages a large part of the city
- ca.260 AD – Alemanni tribes and/or marauding Roman troops destroy Augusta Raurica
- ca.300 AD, following the loss of the Limes Germanicus and the right bank of the Rhine River, the Roman army builds a castra (fort) named Castrum Rauracense near the old site of Augusta Raurica. It was intended to serve as the headquarters of the legio I Martia and to protect a ford over the Rhine.
- 4th century AD
  - The fort grows in importance because it commands a bridge that lies along the road from Gaul to the Danube River.
  - Emperors Constantius II and Julian assemble their armies at the Castrum Rauracense before marching to battle against the Alemanni.
  - A church is built near Castrum Rauracense. The fort and neighboring church become the seat of a bishop, with the bishop first being mentioned in 346.
- 374 AD – The town named Basilea or Basilia (from Greek Basileia, Βασιλεια "kingship") is documented
- ca.400 AD – Following the collapse of the Roman Empire, the Roman troops withdraw from Castrum Rauracense and Basilea, the Germanic Alemanni settled in
- 7th century AD – The bishop moves to Basel and the settlement at Castrum Rauracense declines in importance

== Middle Ages ==
- 740 – Catholic diocese of Basel active (approximate date).
- 752 – A village called Augusta was first mentioned
- 894 – East Francian King Arnulf grants the church in Kaiseraugst (Castrum Rauracense) to his vassal, Anno; the church was then granted to the Abbey of St Gall and then later to the Basel Münster
- 917 – The Magyars destroyed Basel, and later burnt down the monasteries of St Gallen and Rheinau
- 999 – Rudolph III of Burgundy donates the Moutier-Grandval Abbey and all its possessions to Adalbero II of Metz, establishing the Prince-Bishopric of Basel as a secular territory
- 1019 – Basel Minster construction begins.
- 1032 – Town becomes seat of Prince-Bishopric of Basel, Holy Roman Empire.
- 1080 – City wall built (approximate date).
- 1213 – First mention of Jews in Basel.
- 1226
  - Bridge over the Rhine constructed.
  - Furriers guild established.
- 1230 – Inner wall built (approximate date).
- 1349
  - Black Death plague.
  - Basel massacre; murder of the Jews of Basel.
- 1356 – The Basel earthquake shook the city with a maximum MSK intensity, causing 300 deaths in the city and about 1,000 overall.
- 1380 – Public clock installed (approximate date).
- 1398 – Outer wall built.
- 1412 – Guesthouse "Zum Goldenen Sternen" in business (approximate date).
- 1431 – Council of Basel formed.
- 1444 – Battle of St. Jakob an der Birs.
- 1460 – University of Basel established.
- 1466 – Gesellschaft der Feuerschützen (Basel) (militia) formed.
- 1468 – Berthold Ruppel sets up printing press (approximate date).
- 1471 – University Library in operation (approximate date).
- 1488 – Johannes Petri sets up printing press.
- 1491 – Johann Froben establishes printing house (approximate date).
- 1495 – Basel becomes part of Upper Rhenish Imperial Circle.
- 1499 – City hosts Treaty of Basel.
- 1500 – Basel Münster rebuilt.

== Old Swiss Confederacy ==
- 1501 – Basel becomes part of Swiss Confederacy.
- 1521/29 - Erasmus lived in Basel.
- 1523 – Christoph Burckhardt becomes citizen.
- 1528/31 – Hans Holbein lived in Basel.
- 1529 – City becomes Protestant; Catholic bishop moves to Porrentruy.
- 1536 – John Calvin's Institutes of the Christian Religion published.
- 1542
  - Basel thaler (currency) in circulation.
  - Johannes Oporinus sets up printing business.
- 1543 – Andreas Vesalius' De humani corporis fabrica published.
- 1559 – Skalich's Encyclopaedia published.
- 1662 – Amerbaschsches Kabinett established.
- 1774 – Population: 15,040.
- 1777 – Gesellschaft zur Aufmunterung und Beförderung des Guten und Gemeinnützigen founded.
- 1787 – Death of Anna Catharina Bischoff (born 1719, wife of a pastor), whose mummified corpse was rediscovered in 1975 in the Barfüsser Church.
- 1795 – City hosts Peace of Basel.
- 1798 – Basel frank (currency) in circulation.

== Modern history ==
- 1805 – Israelitische Gemeinde Basel (IGB) founded.
- 1815 – Evangelical Missionary Society of Basel formed.
- 1821 – Natural History Museum founded.
- 1833 – Canton of Basel divided.
- 1834 – Basler Stadttheater founded.
- 1839 – Basler Kunstverein founded.
- 1840 – Income tax collection begins in the canton.
- 1850 – Population: 27,844 in city; 29,698 in canton.
- 1864 – Elisabethenkirche built.
- 1867 – Allgemeine Musikschule founded.
- 1870 – Population: 44,848 in city; 47,040 in canton.
- 1872
  - Jews granted full citizenship in Basel.
  - Kunsthalle Basel inaugurated.
- 1874 – Zoo Basel opens.
- 1882 – St. Gotthard railway begins operating.
- 1893 – FC Basel founded.
- 1894 – Basel Historical Museum opens.
- 1897 – City hosts the first Zionist congress.
- 1900 – Population: 109,161 in city; 112,227 in canton.
- 1907 – Basel SBB railway station built.
- 1912 – City hosts Second International meeting.
- 1913 – Basel Badischer Bahnhof built (approximate date).
- 1917
  - Schweizer Mustermesse Basel begins.
  - Ethnographic Museum formed.
- 1923 – Silo Tower built.
- 1925 – Pharmazie-Historisches Museum der Universität Basel founded.
- 1926 – Basel Chamber Orchestra founded.
- 1927 – Boys' Choir of the Protestant Church of Basel-City formed.
- 1933
  - Schola Cantorum Basiliensis founded.
  - Gate of Spalen restored.
- 1945 – 4 March: Bombing by Allied forces.

== After 1945 ==
- 1946 – EuroAirport Basel Mulhouse Freiburg opens as Basel-Mulhouse Airport. It adopted its current name in 1987.
- 1954
  - City of Basel Music Academy formed.
  - St. Jakob Stadium opens.
- 1961 – Antikenmuseum Basel und Sammlung Ludwig founded.
- 1963 – Birskopf Bridge built.
- 1966 – Jewish Museum of Switzerland opens 100 years after the emancipation of Jews in Switzerland.
- 1968 – Merian Gärten (garden) established.
- 1969 – Basel Institute for Immunology founded.
- 1970
  - Art Basel begins.
  - Population: 212,857 in city; 234,945 in canton.
  - The Israelitische Gemeinde Basel (or IGB) is the first Jewish community in Switzerland to be recognised under public law.
- 1973 – Invicta International Airlines Flight 435 crashed south of nearby Hochwald while attempting to land at Basel-Mulhouse Airport. The accident became known in the British media as the Basle air crash and was the deadliest aviation disaster in Swiss history with the loss of 108 lives.
- 1977 – Basler Zeitung (newspaper) begins publication.
- 1979 – Cartoonmuseum Basel founded.
- 1980
  - Paper museum established.
  - Museum of Contemporary Art opens.
  - Population: 182,143 in city; 203,915 in canton.
- 1984 – Swiss Architecture Museum founded.
- 1989 – City hosts Basel Convention on the Control of Transboundary Movements of Hazardous Wastes and Their Disposal.
- 1996 – Museum Tinguely opens.
- 1997 – Sinfonieorchester Basel formed.
- 1998 – Dollhouse Museum opens.
- 2000
  - Music Museum opens.
  - Population: 166,558 in city; 188,079 in canton; 731,167 metro.
- 2001 – St. Jakob-Park stadium opens.
- 2006 – City hosts European Curling Championships.
- 2009 – Novartis Campus opens.
- 2017 – Fondation Beyeler opens a major extension.
- 2017 – The first Basel Peace Forum is held.
- 2025 – Eurovision Song Contest 2025 is held.

== See also ==
- List of councillors of Basel-Stadt
- List of bishops of Basel
- List of cultural property of national significance in Switzerland: Basel-Stadt
- Timelines of other municipalities in Switzerland: Bern, Geneva, Zürich

== Bibliography ==
in English

- Thomas Nugent (1749), "Basil", The Grand Tour, vol. 2: Germany and Holland, London: S. Birt, hdl:2027/mdp.39015030762572
- Theodore Alois Buckley (1862), "Basle", Great Cities of the Middle Ages (2nd ed.), London: Routledge, Warne, & Routledge
- William Henry Overall, ed. (1870). "Basel". Dictionary of Chronology. London: William Tegg. hdl:2027/uc2.ark:/13960/t9m32q949.
- W. Pembroke Fetridge (1878), "Switzerland: Basle", Harper's Hand-Book for Travellers in Europe and the East, New York: Harper & Brothers
- Coolidge, William Augustus Brevoort (1910). "Basel (city)" . Encyclopædia Britannica. Vol. 3 (11th ed.). pp. 462–463.
- Benjamin Vincent (1910), "Basel", Haydn's Dictionary of Dates (25th ed.), London: Ward, Lock & Co., hdl:2027/loc.ark:/13960/t89g6g776 – via HathiTrust
- "Bâle". Switzerland. Grieben's Guide Books (2nd ed.). Berlin: Albert Goldschmidt. 1912. hdl:2027/uc1.$b264107.
- "Bâle", Switzerland (26th ed.), Leipzig: Karl Baedeker, 1922, OCLC 4248970
- Robert E. Dickinson (1961). "Basel". The West European City (2nd ed.). Routledge. ISBN 978-1-136-25970-8.
- Lionel Gossman (1994). "Basel". Geneva, Zurich, Basel: History, Culture, and National Identity. Princeton University Press. p. 63+. ISBN 978-1-4008-6369-3.
- Trudy Ring, ed. (1995). "Basel". Northern Europe. International Dictionary of Historic Places. Fitzroy Dearborn. ISBN 978-1-136-63944-9.
- Wood, Susan (2006). The Proprietary Church in the Medieval West. OUP Oxford. p. 314. ISBN 978-0-19-820697-2.

in German

- "Basel". Topographia Helvetiae, Rhaetiae et Valesiae. Topographia Germaniae (in German). Frankfurt. 1960. hdl:2027/mdp.39015066342117.. 1642–1654 (1960 reprint)
- Wolfgang Adam; Siegrid Westphal, eds. (2012). "Basel". Handbuch kultureller Zentren der Frühen Neuzeit: Städte und Residenzen im alten deutschen Sprachraum (in German). De Gruyter. ISBN 978-3-11-029555-9.
