= List of cultural property of national significance in Switzerland: Basel-Stadt =

This list contains all cultural property of national significance (class A) in the canton of Basel-Stadt from the 2009 Swiss Inventory of Cultural Property of National and Regional Significance. It is sorted by municipality and contains 70 individual buildings, 32 collections and 3 archaeological finds.

The geographic coordinates provided are in the Swiss coordinate system as given in the Inventory.

== Basel ==
KGS No.^{?}	Picture	Name	Street Address	CH1903 X coordinate	CH1903 Y coordinate	Location
1551	Old Catholic Prediger Church	Old Catholic Prediger Church	Totentanz 19	611.044	267.876	47.561502°N 7.585378°E
1553	Anatomical Museum of the University Basel	Anatomical Museum of the University Basel	Pestalozzistrasse 20	610.632	268.226	47.564657°N 7.579912°E
1555	Badischer Bahnhof (Train Station) with Fountain	Badischer Bahnhof (Train Station) with Fountain	Schwarzwaldallee 200	612.663	268.526	47.567319°N 7.606908°E
8895	Bank for International Settlements	Bank for International Settlements	Centralbahnplatz 2	611.511	266.395	47.548174°N 7.591545°E
1564; 8523	Berri-Villen and Museum of Ancient Art and Ludwig Collection	Berri-Villen and Museum of Ancient Art and Ludwig Collection	St Alban-Graben 5 – 7	611.648	267.083	47.55436°N 7.593383°E
1556	Bischofshof with Collegiate church	Bischofshof with Collegiate church	Rittergasse 1	611.607	267.271	47.556051°N 7.592843°E
1557	Blaues Haus (Reichensteinerhof)	Blaues Haus (Reichensteinerhof)	Rheinsprung 16 / Martinsgasse 1	611.334	267.516	47.558259°N 7.589222°E
1558	Bruderholzschul House	Bruderholzschul House	Fritz-Hauser-Strasse 20	611.909	264.593	47.53196°N 7.596784°E
1559	Brunschwiler House	Brunschwiler House	Hebelstrasse 15	610.815	267.777	47.560615°N 7.582333°E
1560	Bundesbahnhof SBB (Train Station)	Bundesbahnhof SBB (Train Station)	Centralbahnstrasse 12 – 26	611.375	266.322	47.54752°N 7.589737°E
1561	Bürgerspital	Bürgerspital	Spitalstrasse 17 – 21	610.877	267.983	47.562467°N 7.583162°E
1562	Café Spitz (Merianflügel)	Café Spitz (Merianflügel)	Greifengasse 2	611.486	267.781	47.56064°N 7.591249°E
8839	Coop Schweiz Central Archive	Coop Schweiz; Central Archive	Thiersteinerallee 14	611.985	265.714	47.542041°N 7.597823°E
10540	Depot of the Archäologischen Bodenforschung des Kantons (Cantonal Archeological Department)	Depot of the Archäologischen Bodenforschung des Kantons (Cantonal Archeological Department)	Lyon-Strasse 41	612.620	264.729	47.53317°N 7.606229°E
1563	Domhof	Domhof	Münsterplatz 10 – 12	611.522	267.238	47.555756°N 7.591713°E
1565; 8522	Former Franciscan Barefoot Order Church and Basel Historical Museum	Former Franciscan Barefoot Order Church and Basel Historical Museum	Barfüsserplatz 7	611.398	267.114	47.554643°N 7.590062°E
1569; 8533	Former Gallizian Paper Mill and Swiss Museum for Paper, Writing and Printing	Former Gallizian Paper Mill and Swiss Museum for Paper, Writing and Printing	St. Alban-Tal 37	612.404	267.122	47.554696°N 7.603427°E
1566	Former Carthusian House of St Margarethental	Former Carthusian House of St Margarethental	Theodorskirchplatz 7	611.880	267.518	47.558268°N 7.596477°E
1585	Former Klingental-Kaserne with Klingental Church	Former Klingental-Kaserne with Klingental Church	Kasernenstrasse 23	611.367	267.936	47.562036°N 7.589671°E
1673	Fasnachtsbrunnen (Fountain)	Fasnachtsbrunnen (Fountain)	Theaterplatz	611.436	267.001	47.553626°N 7.590564°E
1567	Feuerschützenhaus (Fire Station)	Feuerschützenhaus (Fire Station)	Schützenmattstrasse 56	610.453	266.997	47.553606°N 7.577505°E
9153	Company Archive of Novartis	Company Archive of Novartis	Fabrikstrasse 2	610.741	269.129	47.572776°N 7.581383°E
1568	Fischmarktbrunnen (fountain)	Fischmarktbrunnen (fountain)	Am Fischmarkt	611.165	267.623	47.559225°N 7.58698°E
1570		Gasfabrik; Celtic Settlement	Voltastrasse	610.758	269.072	47.572263°N 7.581607°E
1571	Geltenzunft	Geltenzunft	Marktplatz 13	611.273	267.469	47.557838°N 7.588411°E
1690	Gymnasium (School) am Kohlenberg (St Leonhard)	Gymnasium (School) am Kohlenberg (St Leonhard)	Kohlenberg 17	611.213	267.063	47.554187°N 7.587603°E
1695	Hauptpost (Main Post Office)	Hauptpost (Main Post Office)	Gerbergasse 13 / Freie Strasse 12	611.305	267.401	47.557226°N 7.588834°E
1583; 8617	House zum Kirschgarten, part of the Basel Historical Museum	House zum Kirschgarten, part of the Basel Historical Museum	Elisabethenstrasse 27	611.491	266.829	47.552078°N 7.59129°E
1575	House zum Raben	House zum Raben	Aeschenvorstadt 15 / Picassoplatz 9	611.611	266.952	47.553182°N 7.592888°E
9283; 8803	Historic Archive Roche and Industrial Complex Hoffmann-La Roche	Historic Archive Roche and Industrial Complex Hoffmann-La Roche	Grenzacherstrasse 183	612.565	267.635	47.559307°N 7.605581°E
1579	Hohenfirstenhof	Hohenfirstenhof	Rittergasse 19	611.698	267.236	47.555735°N 7.594051°E
1580	Holsteinerhof	Holsteinerhof	Hebelstrasse 30	610.756	267.826	47.561057°N 7.58155°E
8530	Jewish Museum of Switzerland	Jewish Museum of Switzerland	Kornhausgasse 8	610.891	267.317	47.556477°N 7.583332°E
1606	Caricature & Cartoon Museum Basel	Caricature & Cartoon Museum Basel	St Alban-Vorstadt 28	611.871	267.100	47.554508°N 7.596346°E
9152		Karl Barth-Archive	Bruderholzallee 26	611.190	264.878	47.534536°N 7.587243°E
1582	Catholic Church of St Antonius	Catholic Church of St Antonius	Kannenfeldstrasse 35	610.116	268.142	47.563909°N 7.573054°E
9377	Kleines Klingental (Lower Klingen Valley) with Museum Klingental	Kleines Klingental (Lower Klingen Valley) with Museum Klingental	Unterer Rheinweg 17 a – 27	611.306	268.053	47.563089°N 7.588864°E
1586; 8618	Art Museum with Copperplate Collection	Art Museum with Copperplate Collection	St Alban-Graben 16	611.695	267.077	47.554305°N 7.594007°E
1587	Lohnhof (Former Augustinians Collegiate Church)	Lohnhof (Former Augustinians Collegiate Church)	Kohlenberg 20	611.222	267.123	47.554727°N 7.587724°E
8910	Mission 21, Archive of the evangelischen Missionswerks Basel	Mission 21, Archive of the evangelischen Missionswerks Basel	Missionsstrasse 21	610.541	267.615	47.559163°N 7.578689°E
1588	Mittlere Rhein Brücke (Mid-Rhine Bridge)	Mittlere Rhein Brücke (Mid-Rhine Bridge)	Eisengasse / Greifengasse	611.372	267.726	47.560147°N 7.589733°E
1597	Münster (Cathedral) with Kreuzgängen and Pfalz	Münster (Cathedral) with Kreuzgängen and Pfalz	Münsterplatz 9	611.544	267.297	47.556286°N 7.592007°E
9592	Münsterhügel / Old City (Late La Tène and medieval settlement)	Münsterhügel / Old City (Late La Tène and medieval settlement)		611.500	267.300	47.556314°N 7.591422°E
1591; 8525; 8526	Natural History Museum of Basel and the Museum of Cultures Basel	Natural History Museum of Basel and the Museum of Cultures Basel	Augustinergasse 2	611.425	267.450	47.557664°N 7.59043°E
8524	Museum of Contemporary Art (Basel) with E. Hoffmann Collection	Museum of Contemporary Art (Basel) with E. Hoffmann Collection	St Alban-Rheinweg 60	612.253	267.111	47.5546°N 7.601421°E
8531	Museum Jean Tinguely in Basel	Museum Jean Tinguely in Basel	Paul Sacher-Anlage 2	613.064	267.613	47.5591°N 7.61221°E
1605	Music Museum (Basel), part of the Basel Historical Museum	Music Museum (Basel), part of the Basel Historical Museum	Im Lohnhof 9	611.270	267.126	47.554753°N 7.588362°E
1771	Musiksaal (Music Hall)	Musiksaal (Music Hall)	Steinenberg 14	611.346	267.069	47.554239°N 7.58937°E
8527	Pharmacy Museum of the Universität Basel	Pharmacy Museum of the Universität Basel	Totengässlein 3	611.122	267.551	47.558578°N 7.586407°E
8528	Poster Collection of the Schule für Gestaltung	Poster Collection of the Schule für Gestaltung	Spalenvorstadt 2	610.942	267.423	47.55743°N 7.584012°E
1602	Ramsteinerhof	Ramsteinerhof	Rittergasse 7	611.665	267.252	47.555879°N 7.593613°E
1603	Rathaus (Town council house) with Standbild by Munatius Plancus	Rathaus (Town council house) with Standbild by Munatius Plancus	Marktplatz 9	611.256	267.503	47.558144°N 7.588186°E
1592	Reformed Elisabethen Church	Reformed Elisabethen Church	Elisabethenstrasse 14	611.486	266.899	47.552708°N 7.591226°E
1593	Reformed Johannes Church	Reformed Johannes Church	Mühlhauserstrasse 145	610.258	268.343	47.565715°N 7.574946°E
1595	Former Reformed Leonhards Church	Former Reformed Leonhards Church	Leonhardskirchplatz 10	611.226	267.156	47.555023°N 7.587778°E
1596	Reformed Martins Church	Reformed Martins Church	Martinskirchplatz 4	611.279	267.591	47.558935°N 7.588493°E
1598	Pauluskirche (Basel), Reformed, also called Paulus Church	Pauluskirche (Basel), Reformed, also called Paulus Church	Steinenring 20	610.517	266.782	47.551671°N 7.57835°E
1599	Reformed Peters Church	Reformed Peters Church	Peterskirchplatz 7	611.009	267.626	47.559254°N 7.584907°E
1600	Reformed St Alban's Church	Reformed St Alban's Church	St. Alban-Kirchrain 11	612.211	267.092	47.55443°N 7.600863°E
1601	Reformed Theodors Church	Reformed Theodors Church	Theodorskirchplatz 5	611.949	267.576	47.558788°N 7.597395°E
9812	Rundhof Building of the Schweizerischen Mustermesse	Rundhof Building of the Schweizerischen Mustermesse	Messeplatz 9	612.258	268.217	47.564547°N 7.601518°E
1604	Safranzunft	Safranzunft	Gerbergasse 11	611.262	267.408	47.557289°N 7.588263°E
1607	Sandgrube	Sandgrube	Riehenstrasse 154	612.596	268.237	47.564721°N 7.60601°E
1608	Gundeldingen Castle	Gundeldingen Castle	Gundeldingerstrasse 280	611.554	265.480	47.539944°N 7.592092°E
1609	Schönes Haus and Schöner Hof	Schönes Haus and Schöner Hof	Nadelberg 6	611.051	267.526	47.558354°N 7.585463°E
9393	School House Wasgenring	School House Wasgenring	Welschmattstrasse 30	609.252	267.982	47.562483°N 7.56157°E
8812	Schweizerisches Wirtschaftsarchiv	Schweizerisches Wirtschaftsarchiv	Peter Merian-Weg 6	611.897	266.080	47.545334°N 7.596664°E
1614	Seidenhof with Standbild Rudolf von Habsburg	Seidenhof with Standbild Rudolf von Habsburg	Blumenrain 34	611.119	267.869	47.561438°N 7.586375°E
1615	Sculpture Hall	Sculpture Hall	Mittlere Strasse 17	610.582	267.767	47.560529°N 7.579237°E
1616	Spalenhof	Spalenhof	Spalenberg 12 / Pfeffergässlein 25	611.120	267.409	47.557301°N 7.586376°E
1618	Spiesshof	Spiesshof	Heuberg 7	611.075	267.311	47.55642°N 7.585776°E
8529	Sport Museum Schweiz	Sport Museum Schweiz	Missionsstrasse 28	610.483	267.692	47.559856°N 7.57792°E
8788	Cantonal Archive of Basel-Stadt	Cantonal Archive of Basel-Stadt	Martinsgasse 2	611.305	267.546	47.55853°N 7.588838°E
10144	City Fortifications	City Fortifications		611.000	267.000	47.553624°N 7.584772°E
1623	Stadthaus (Former Post)	Stadthaus (Former Post)	Stadthausgasse 13 /	611.142	267.561	47.558667°N 7.586673°E
1625	Synagoge	Synagoge	Eulerstrasse 2	610.827	267.085	47.554392°N 7.582476°E
9168	UBS AG, Group Historical Archives	UBS AG, Group Historical Archives	Aeschenplatz 6	611.943	266.766	47.551503°N 7.597293°E
1627; 8838; 9326	University Library and Public Library with Handwritten Record Section and Music Collection	University Library and Public Library with Handwritten Record Section and Music Collection	Schönbeinstrasse 18	610.708	267.681	47.559754°N 7.580909°E
1629	Weisses Haus (Wendelstörferhof)	Weisses Haus (Wendelstörferhof)	Martinsgasse 3	611.349	267.492	47.558043°N 7.589421°E
1630	Wildtsches House	Wildtsches House	Petersplatz 13	610.881	267.665	47.559607°N 7.583207°E
1631	House Zum Neuen Singer	House Zum Neuen Singer	Speiserstrasse 98	612.996	266.241	47.546762°N 7.611267°E
1894	Wolfgottesacker	Wolfgottesacker	Münchensteinerstrasse 99	612.688	265.417	47.539357°N 7.607152°E
1633	Zerkindenhof	Zerkindenhof	Nadelberg 10	611.045	267.503	47.558147°N 7.585382°E
10470	Zoological Garden	Zoological Garden	Birsigstrasse 51	610.555	266.290	47.547246°N 7.578843°E
Unknown		ISOS Stadt: Basel				

== Bettingen ==
KGS No.^{?}	Picture	Name	Street Address	CH1903 X coordinate	CH1903 Y coordinate	Location
Unknown		ISOS Spezialfall: St. Chrischona				

== Riehen ==
KGS No.^{?}	Picture	Name	Street Address	CH1903 X coordinate	CH1903 Y coordinate	Location
8532	Beyeler Foundation	Beyeler Foundation	Baselstrasse 101	615.961	270.784	47.587554°N 7.650814°E
1915	Cemetery am Hörnli with Crematorium	Cemetery am Hörnli with Crematorium	Hörnliallee 70	615.155	268.399	47.566124°N 7.640019°E
1901	New and Old Wenkenhof with Park	New and Old Wenkenhof with Park		616.121	269.375	47.574878°N 7.65289°E
1900	Reformed Village Church of St Martin with Meierhof and Ring Wall	Reformed Village Church of St Martin with Meierhof and Ring Wall	Kirchplatz 5	615.815	270.478	47.584806°N 7.648863°E
1902; 8551	Wettsteinhäuser (Toy Museum and Village Museum) and the Toy Museum Collection	Wettsteinhäuser (Toy Museum and Village Museum) and the Toy Museum Collection	Baselstrasse 30	615.855	270.371	47.583843°N 7.64939°E
1903	Colnaghi House	Colnaghi House	Wenkenstrasse 81	616.142	269.715	47.577936°N 7.653182°E
1904	Huber House	Huber House	Hackbergstrasse 29	615.766	269.236	47.573637°N 7.648167°E
1905	Schaeffer-von Déchend House	Schaeffer-von Déchend House	Sandreuterweg 44	616.298	269.906	47.57965°N 7.655262°E
Unknown		ISOS Verstädtertes Village: Riehen				
