= Lienzo Vischer I =

1557 Indigenous Mexican map

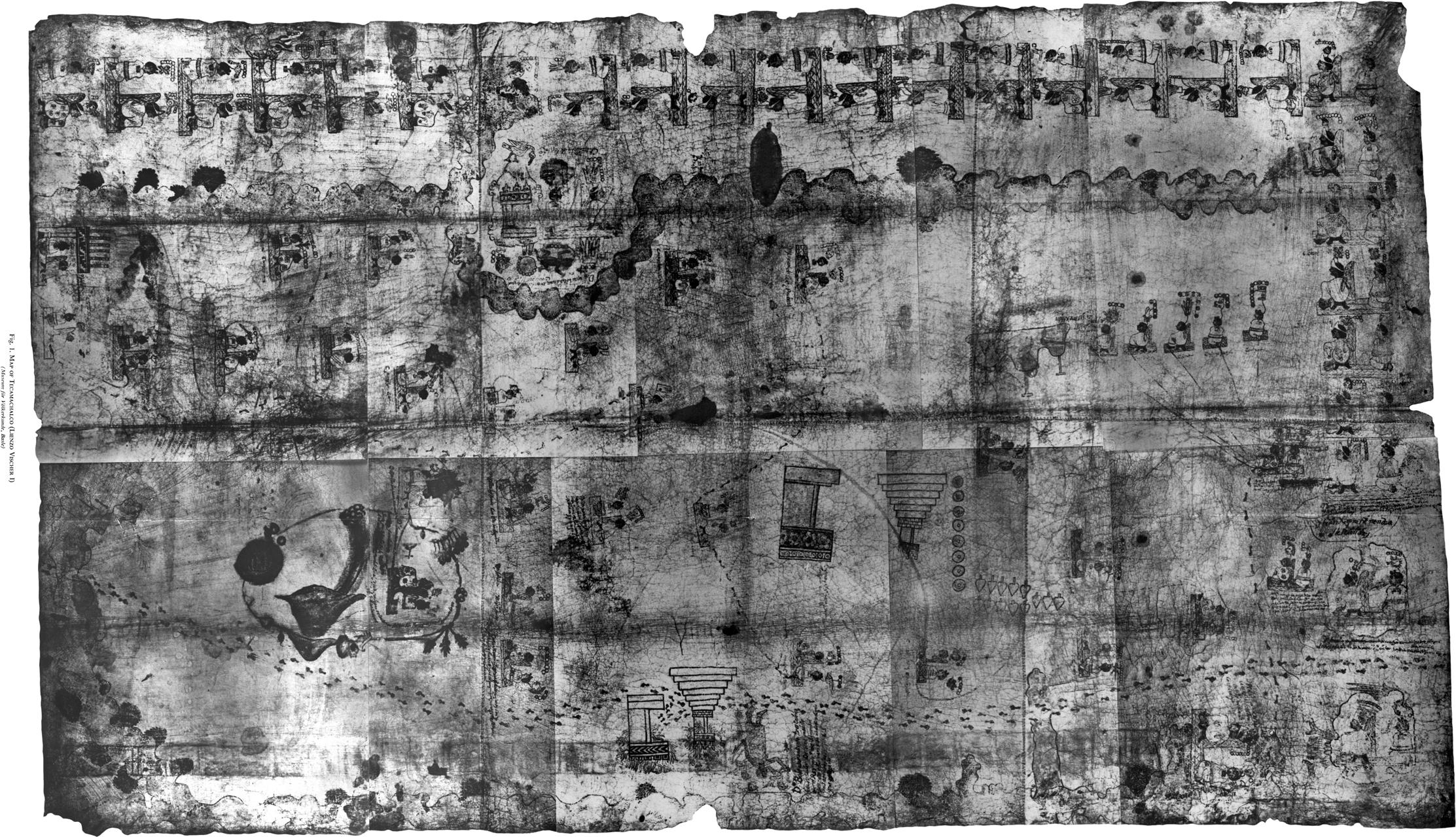
A black and white photo of the lienzo.

The Lienzo Vischer I is an indigenous Mexican map of the altepetl of Tecamachalco and its surroundings, completed in 1557. It is painted on deerskin, and measures 2.42 by 1.45 metres (7.9 by 4.8 ft). Like other indigenous maps, it contains historical as well as geographical information, including several generations of the dynasty that ruled Tecamachalco.

The lienzo is named after Swiss collector Lukas Vischer, who brought it from Mexico to Basel in Switzerland, where it now resides in the Museum of Cultures. It is also known as the Lienzo de Tecamachalco, or Mapa de Tecamachalco.

== See also ==
- Anales de Tecamachalco
