= Lukas Vischer =

Lukas Vischer may refer to:

- Lukas Vischer (collector) (1780–1840), Swiss traveler and collector
- Lukas Vischer (theologian) (1926–2008), Swiss Reformed ecumenical theologian
