= Dan Allon =

Israeli interdisciplinary artist (born 1982)

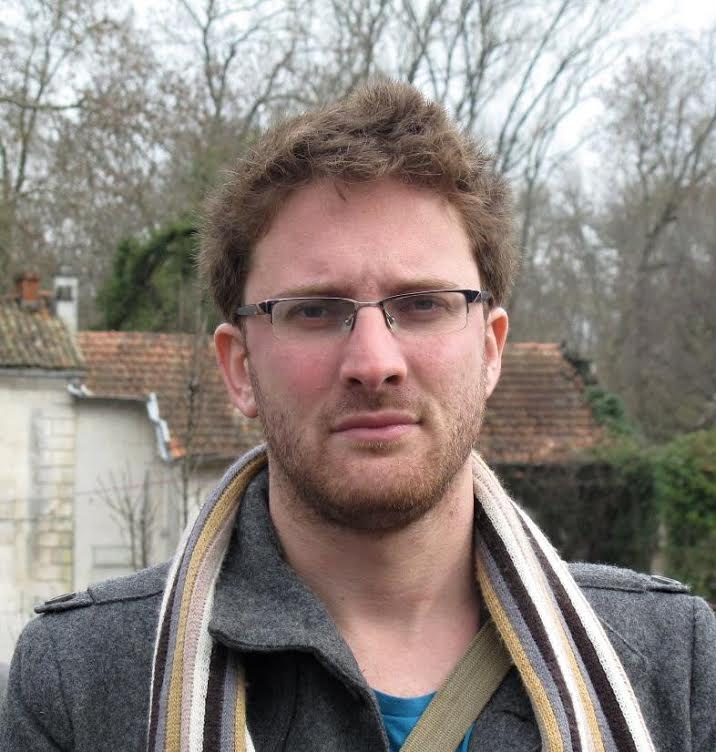
- Dan Allon
- Born: 1982 (age 43–44); Netanya, Israel
- Known for: Drawing, painting, performance, installation
- Movement: Israeli art

Dan Allon (Hebrew: דן אלון, born 1982) is an Israeli interdisciplinary artist. He works mostly in the fields of visual art and graphic novels. He exhibited solo shows in museums and galleries, such as Cartoonmuseum Basel, and regularly participates in group shows, book fairs and performance events. Allon also curated exhibitions. In the majority of his artworks, Allon investigates the connection between a biography to subjects such as humor, artistic action and power. He usually does so using his own life-story as means.

== Biography ==
Allon was born in Netanya, Israel and studied art in high school. After his graduation, he served as a sergeant major in the military incarceration facility Ktzi'ot for three years. In 2004, he published his first zine and had a blog named "garlic pepper and anal sex". In the years 2005–2009, he received his bachelor in visual communication from Shenkar College Engineering and Design.

After graduation, he started creating comic books and booklets (for example, in 2010 he published "Hysteric Behavior", cooperation with author Etgar Keret), participate in book fairs and also teach visual communication. His books were shown in the Fumetto festival, Lucerne and the Angoulême International Comics Festival. He was a part of the Artist collectives of "P8 gallery" and "Hanina Place for Art" in Tel Aviv.

Since 2009, Allon is also active in the art world. His first solo show was exhibited in Tel Aviv that year. At first, he focused on painting and drawing, but after attending HaMidrasha – Faculty of the Arts in the years 2012–2014, he expanded his research to performance and installation. His most famous project is "The Dictator", which deals with his time in the army. In one work, Allon locked himself up in a gallery for a week, being the prisoner and the warden of himself at the same time. In 2010, he teamed up with Shani Broner, an Israeli musician, to publish a radio drama album called ״Two Days One Night״ under the name "Satla Land". The duo regularly performs in galleries and museums, such as Cartoonmuseum Basel and Haifa Museum of Art. In 2016, they published a short EP release called The F2's.

== Solo and two-person exhibitions ==
=== Museums ===
- 2012 – We'll Call You Back, Museum of Israeli Art, Ramat Gan, Israel

=== Galleries ===
- 2016 – Feel at home but don't forget it's my home, Gabirol Gallery, Tel Aviv
- 2016 – All in order Mr. General, Caos Gallery, Venice, Italy
- 2016 – Visiting the ghost of Mrs. Swissa, Hôtel Central, Casablanca, Morocco
- 2016 – Visiting the ghost of Mrs. Swissa, Nadie Nunca Nada No!, Madrid, Spain
- 2016 – Paint, with Ayala Netzer, Hanina gallery, Tel Aviv, Israel
- 2015 – The Nut-case & The victim, with Gary Goldstein, ArtSpace Gallery, Tel Aviv, Israel
- 2015 – Five Star Souvenirs, Digital Art Incubator, Hayarkon 19, Tel Aviv, Israel
- 2014 – All in order Mr. General, Meshuna Gallery, Tel Aviv, Israel
- 2014 – The Shawish of section four, Hayarkon 19 Gallery, Tel Aviv, Israel
- 2012 – Do not turn out like me, Gerstein Gallery, Tel Aviv, Israel
- 2012 – Shop Kipping, one-month store at Maze 9, Tel Aviv, Israel
- 2011 – Max Kessel, P8 Gallery, Tel Aviv, Israel
- 2009 – Fucking with patience, Apart Art Gallery, Tel Aviv, Israel

== Collections ==
Allon's works are in the following collections: Cartoonmuseum Basel, The Israeli Cartoon Museum and Bank Leumi collection.

== Books ==
- 2016 – Adventure in the Museum, Gnat Publishing, Tel Aviv (with Keren Katz) (in Hebrew)
- 2013 – Plumbing Problems, self-published, Tel Aviv (in Hebrew)
- 2011 – The Chronicles of Vassil (in Hebrew), story by Noam Naumovsky based on stories by Micha Josef Berdyczewski, self-published, Tel Aviv
- 2010 – Hysterical Behavior (in Hebrew), stories by Etgar Keret and Shoham Smit, self-published, Tel Aviv
- 2009 – Cecil's Last Chance (in Hebrew), self-published, Tel Aviv
