= Musical Instrument Museum =

Musical Instrument Museum or Museum of Musical Instruments may refer to:

Worldwide:

- Accademia Nazionale di Santa Cecilia Musical Instruments Museum, Rome, Italy
- Bate Collection of Musical Instruments, Oxford, United Kingdom
- Berlin Musical Instrument Museum, Germany
- Eboardmuseum, Klagenfurt, Austria
- Galleria Borghèse - The National Museum of Musical Instruments, Rome, Italy
- Gurminj Museum of Musical Instruments, Dushanbe, Tajikistan
- Musée de la musique - Cité de la musique, Paris, France
- Museum of Greek Folk Musical Instruments, Athens, Greece
- Museum of Musical Instruments, Céret, France
- Museum of Musical Instruments of Leipzig University, Germany
- Museum of Musical Instruments (Florence), Italy
- Museum of Musical Instruments (Milan), Italy
- Museum of Portuguese Music
- Music Museum (Basel), Switzerland
- Musical Instrument Museum, Brussels, Belgium
- Musical Instrument Museum (Volgograd), Russia
- Povilas Stulga Museum of Lithuanian Folk Instruments, Kaunas, Lithuania
- Stringed Instruments Museum, Tebosa, Portugal

United States:

- Metropolitan Museum of Art Musical Instrument Collection, New York, New York, United States
- Museum of Making Music, Carlsbad, California, United States
- Musical Instrument Museum (Phoenix), Arizona, United States
- National Music Museum, Vermillion, South Dakota, United States
- Schubert Club Museum of Musical Instruments, St. Paul, Minnesota, United States
- Songbirds Guitar Museum Guitar museum in Chattanooga, Tennessee, United States
- Yale University Collection of Musical Instruments, New Haven, Connecticut, United States

== See also ==
- Mandolin Melodies Museum, Nagoya, Japan
- Category:Musical instrument museums
