= Anales de Tecamachalco =

The Anales de Tecamachalco or Annals of Tecamachalco is an anonymous Nahuatl-language historical manuscript held by the Benson Latin American Collection of the University of Texas.

== Publication ==
- Peñafiel, Antonio (1903). Anales de Tecamachalco. Colección de documentos para la historia mexicana.
- Solís, Eustaquio Celestino; Luis Reyes García (1992). Anales de Tecamachalco: 1398-1590. ISBN 968-16-3797-6.

== See also ==
- Lienzo Vischer I
