= Walls of Basel =

Series of fortifications surrounding the center of Basel, Switzerland

Coordinates: 47°33′34″N 7°35′18″E

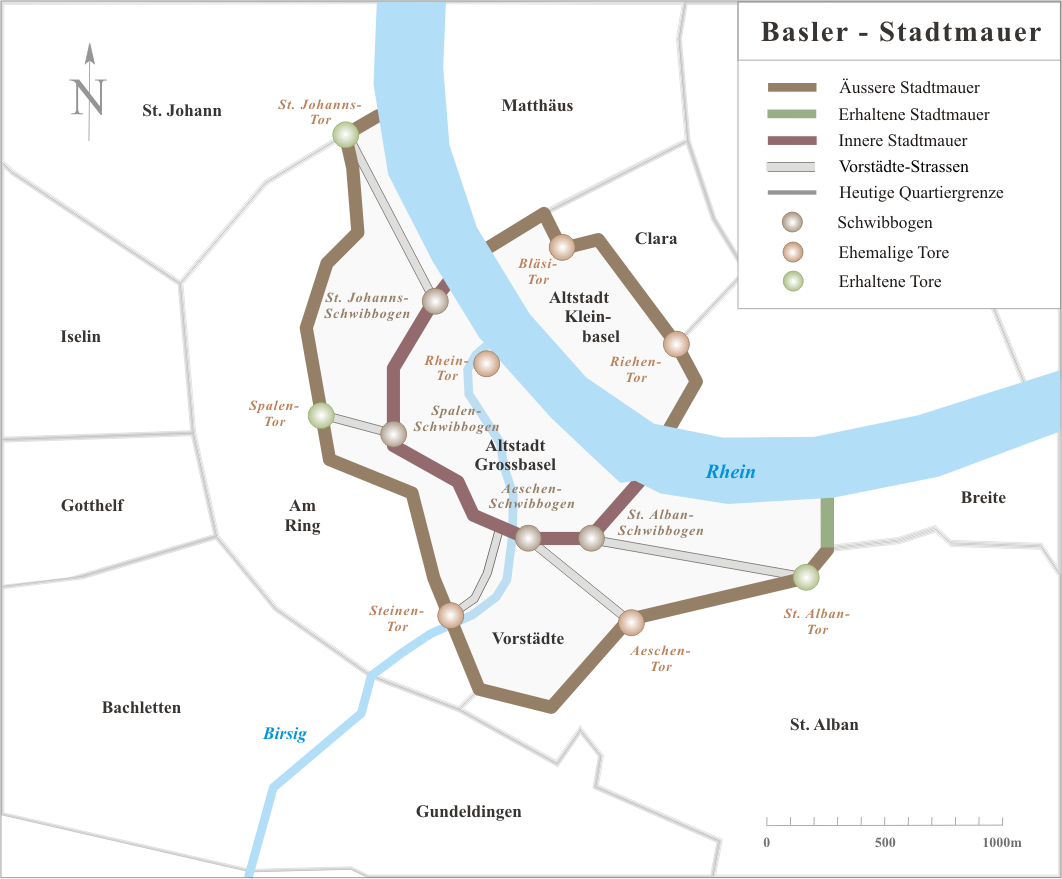
Map of Basel city walls

The Basel city walls are a complex of walls surrounding the central part of the Swiss city of Basel, only partially preserved today. The first city wall was completed around 1080 under bishop Burkhard von Fenis. A newer wall was constructed around 1230, which is known as the Inner Wall. Its course was mostly identical to the Burkhard wall. In 1362 the construction of a larger wall complex began due to the city's expansion; it was completed in 1398, and is known as the Outer Wall. In 1859 the city's executives decided to raze the inner wall and gates to the ground. Three outer city gates and a short piece of the wall were saved from demolition and are being preserved as part of the city's heritage.

== History ==
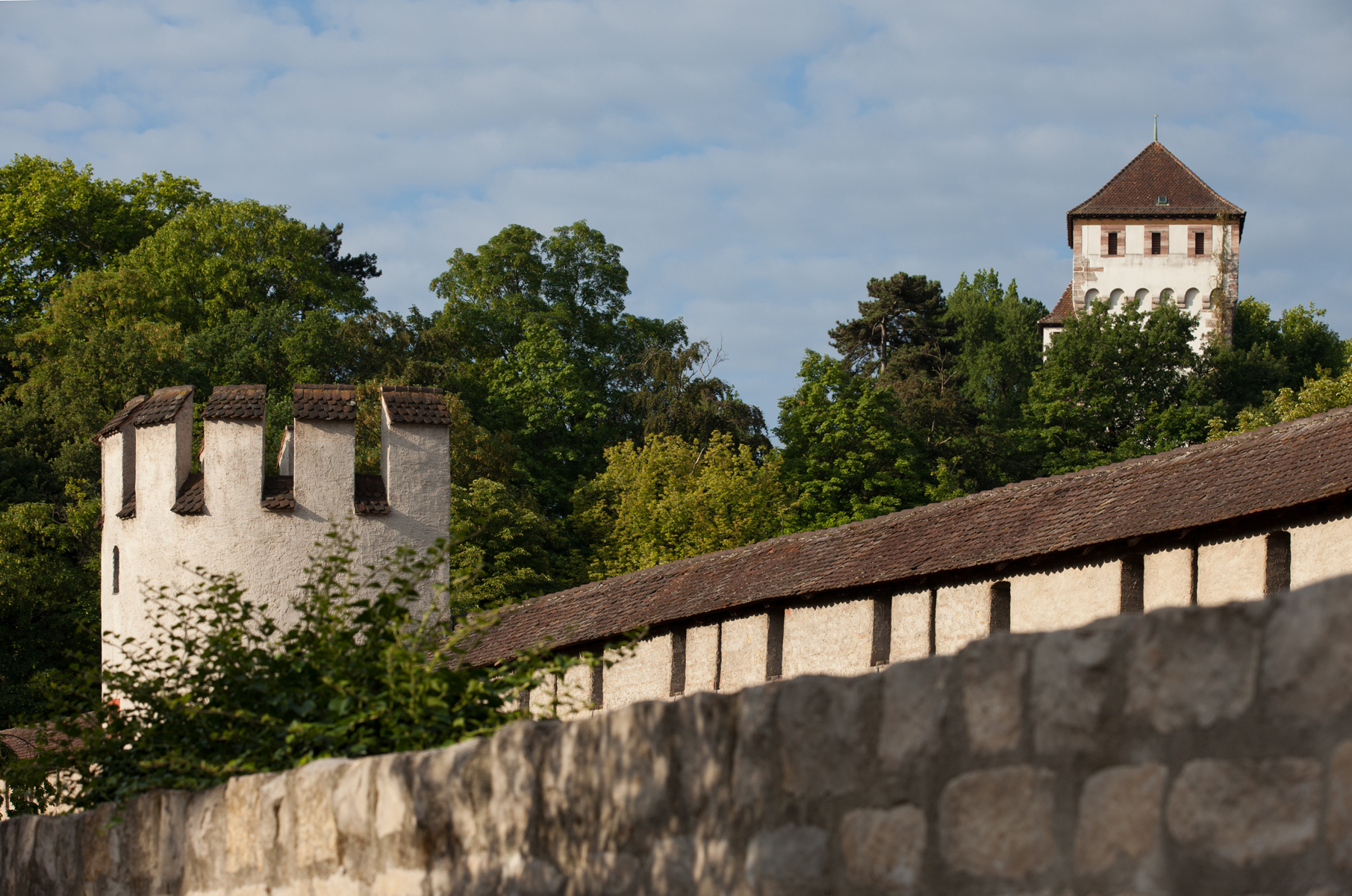
Old city wall at Letziplatz

At the end of the 11th century, the growing settlement in the valley was walled, though settlement continued outside the wall. As the town spread up the west slopes surrounding the Birsig river, that section was walled also. At the beginning of the 13th century, all these sections were included within a single wall that embraced both the valley and hill settlements. In 1362, the city began building a new, wider city wall, which also enclosed the suburbs. It is possible that the destruction wrought by the earthquake of 1356 contributed to the decision to build a new wall. Among the construction materials were debris from the destruction and Jewish gravestones from the cemetery of the first Jewish community of Basel, which was destroyed in the violence surrounding the outbreak of the Black Death in 1348. The construction of the outer city walls was completed in 1398 and these walls lasted until the mid-nineteenth century.

In 1859, the city walls were demolished in order to increase space and improve hygiene conditions in the city. The debris from the demolished walls were used to fill in the city moat, and these areas were converted into new streets and spaces, many of which bear names referring to the original wall. During this process, most of the embedded gravestones were lost. Ten of the few remaining ones are on display in the courtyard of the Jewish Museum of Switzerland.

== City gates ==
=== Outer gates ===
Three gates from the outer wall have been preserved, and today they represent landmarks of Basel and a heritage site of national significance:

- The Spalentor (Gate of Spalen, formerly also Gate of Saint Paul) is regarded as one of the most beautiful gates of Switzerland.
- The Sankt-Alban-Tor (Gate of Saint Alban)
- The Sankt-Johanns-Tor (Gate of Saint John).
- The Aeschentor (Aeschen Gate) was pulled down in 1861 along with three other gateways and the city walls. From the 14th century, it was the principal gate from Basel to Aesch.
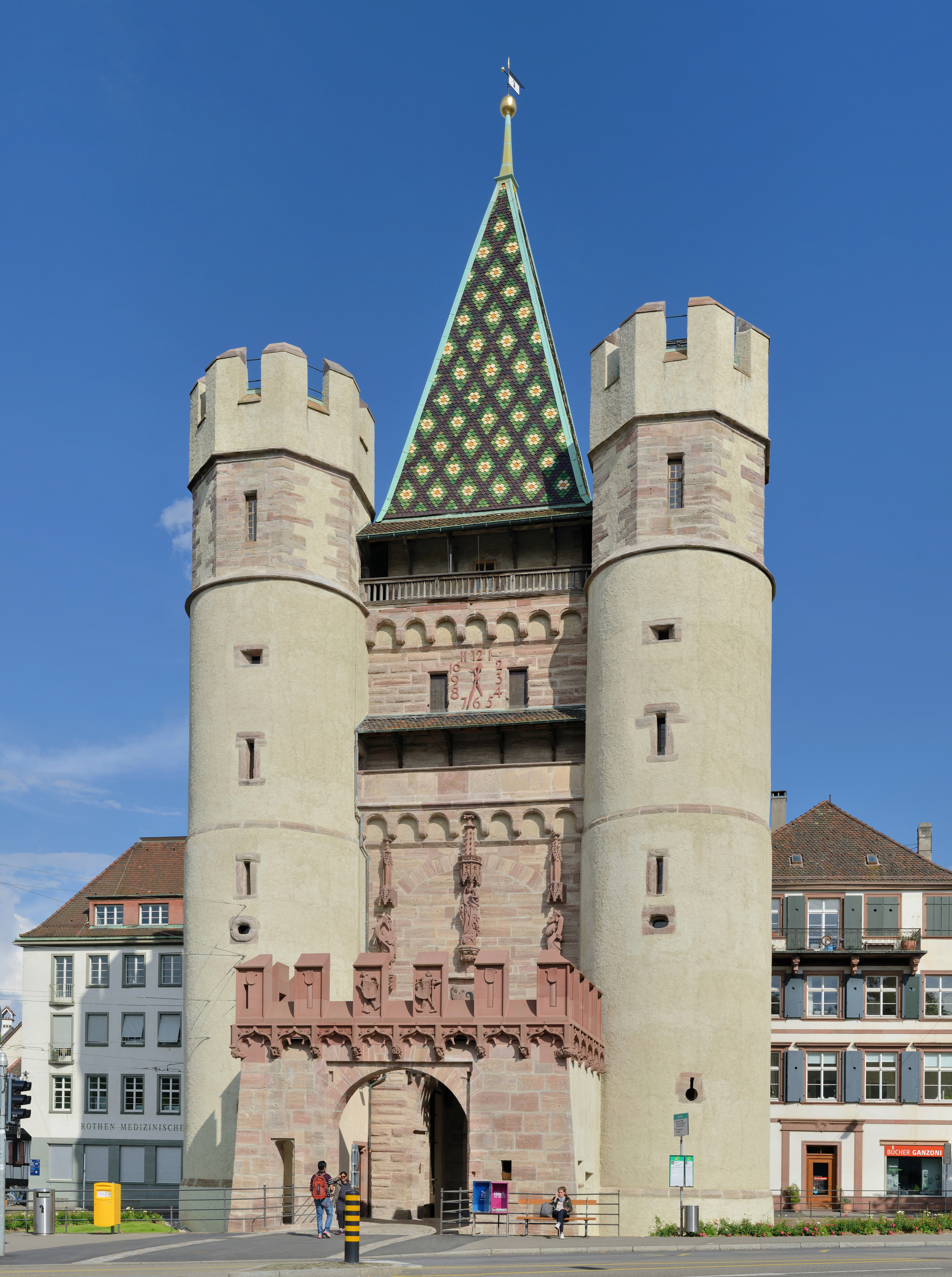
Spalentor

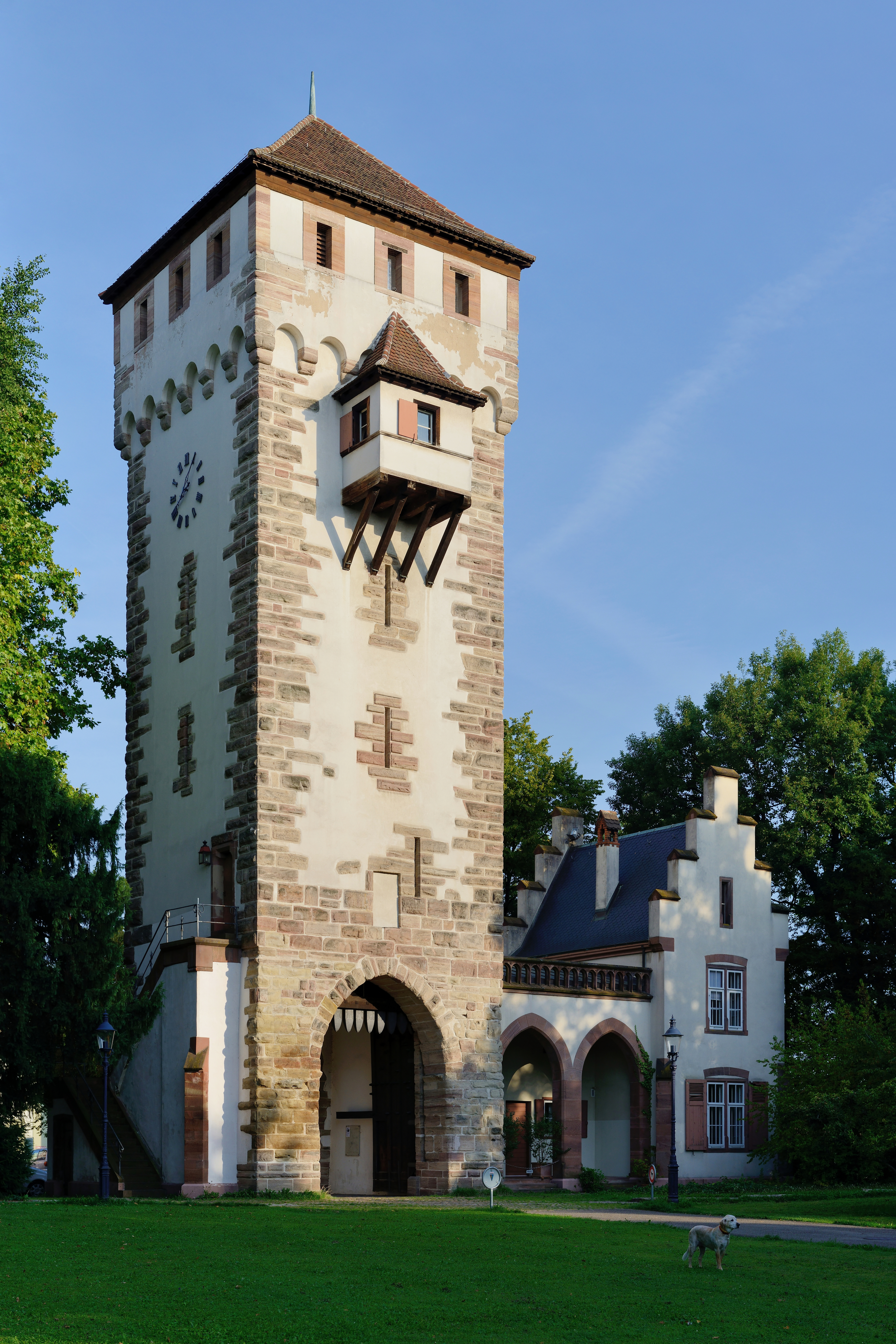
Sankt-Alban-Tor

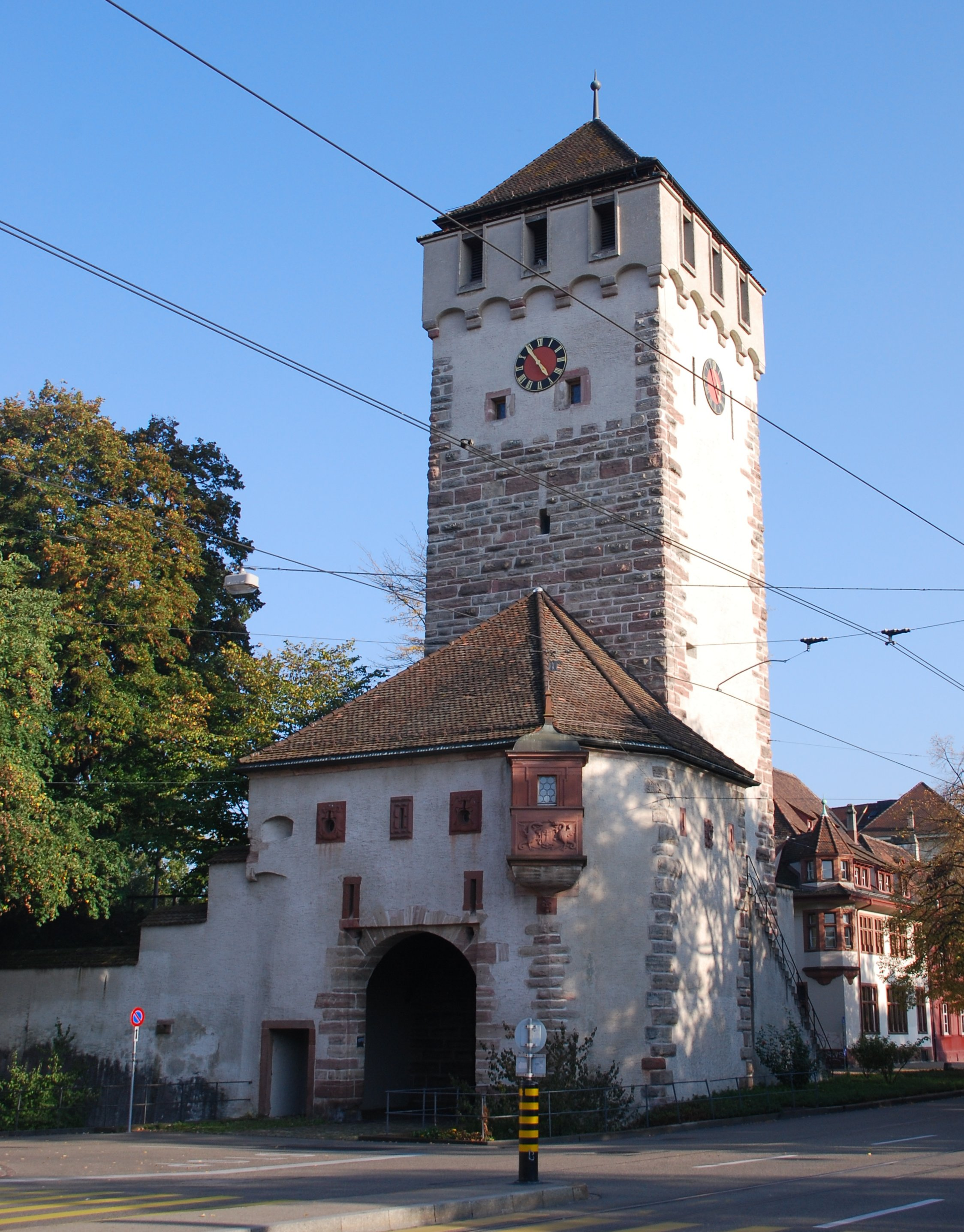
Sankt-Johanns-Tor

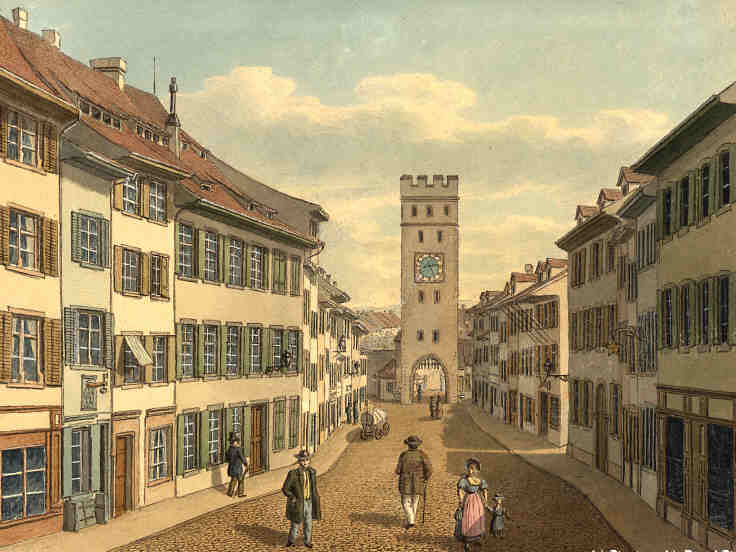
Aeschentor, c. 1850

=== Inner gates ===
The inner walls used to encircle the Great Basel (Gross Basel) on the west bank and Small Basel (Kleinbasel) on the east bank of the Rhine. All the inner gates and walls were demolished between 1860 and 1870:

==== East bank ====
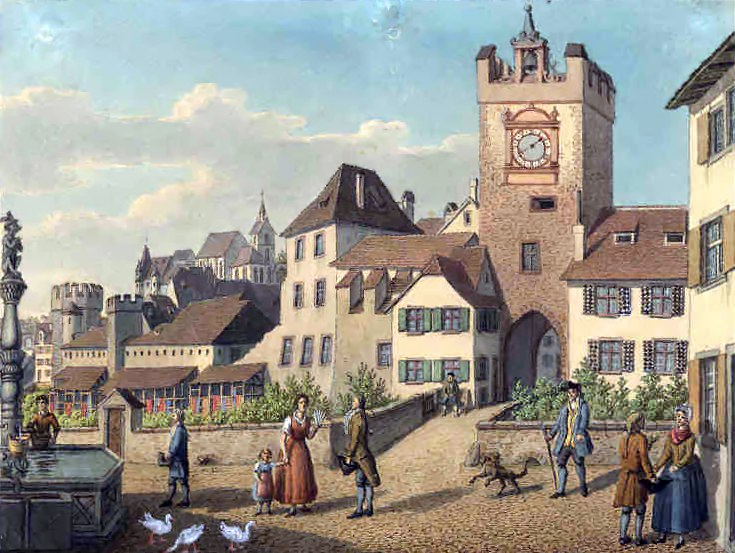
Aeschenschwibbogen, an 1841 watercolour

- Aeschenschwibbogen was a small gate near the east bank of the Birsig. Aesch is a village about 8 km (5.0 mi) south of Basel old town. (It is nowadays a suburb of the city.) A Schwibbogen is a type of buttress, in the form of an arch which braces the structures on either side. Aeschenschwibbogen was first documented in 1261 as 'Eschmertor', in connection with a donation to Saint Urban's Abbey. Later names include 'Aeschentor' and 'Inneres Aeschentor'. Its original function became obsolete in the 14th century when the outer city wall was built, and that function was taken over by the Aeschentor in the outer wall. The upper half of the tower was removed in August 1545, after a crack in the masonry appeared. The gate is recorded as having been equipped with a clock from the middle of the 16th century.

In August 1839, Rudolf Forcart-Hoffmann, a manufacturer of passementerie, petitioned the Kleiner Rat ('Lesser Council') of Basel that Aeschenschwibbogen should be demolished. He wanted to build a new house, Schilthof, at the location. This would serve a double purpose: beautifying the city, and removing a bottleneck on an important traffic route. Permission was granted, and Aeschenschwibbogen was demolished in 1841.

- The Steinentor (Gate of Steinen) was pulled down in 1866 along with most of the city walls.
- The Rheintor (Rhine Gate) was pulled down in 1839, about twenty years before the other city walls. It was located at the Rhine bridge on the western river bank.

==== West bank ====
- The Riehentor (Gate of Riehen) was pulled down in 1864.
- The Bläsitor (Gate of Saint Blaise) was pulled down in 1867.

=== Other wall buildings ===
- The Thomasturm (Thomas Tower) was a watchtower just across the Sankt-Johanns-Tor. It was named after Thomas Becket, Archbishop of Canterbury.
- Letziturm (Letzi Tower) consists of two closely spaced towers at the eastern end of the walls, near the Sankt-Alban-Tor.
- Rail gate (built in the 19th century along with the Alsatian rail station)
- Gate of Brigitte (in the Saint Alban quarter)
- Upper Rhine gate
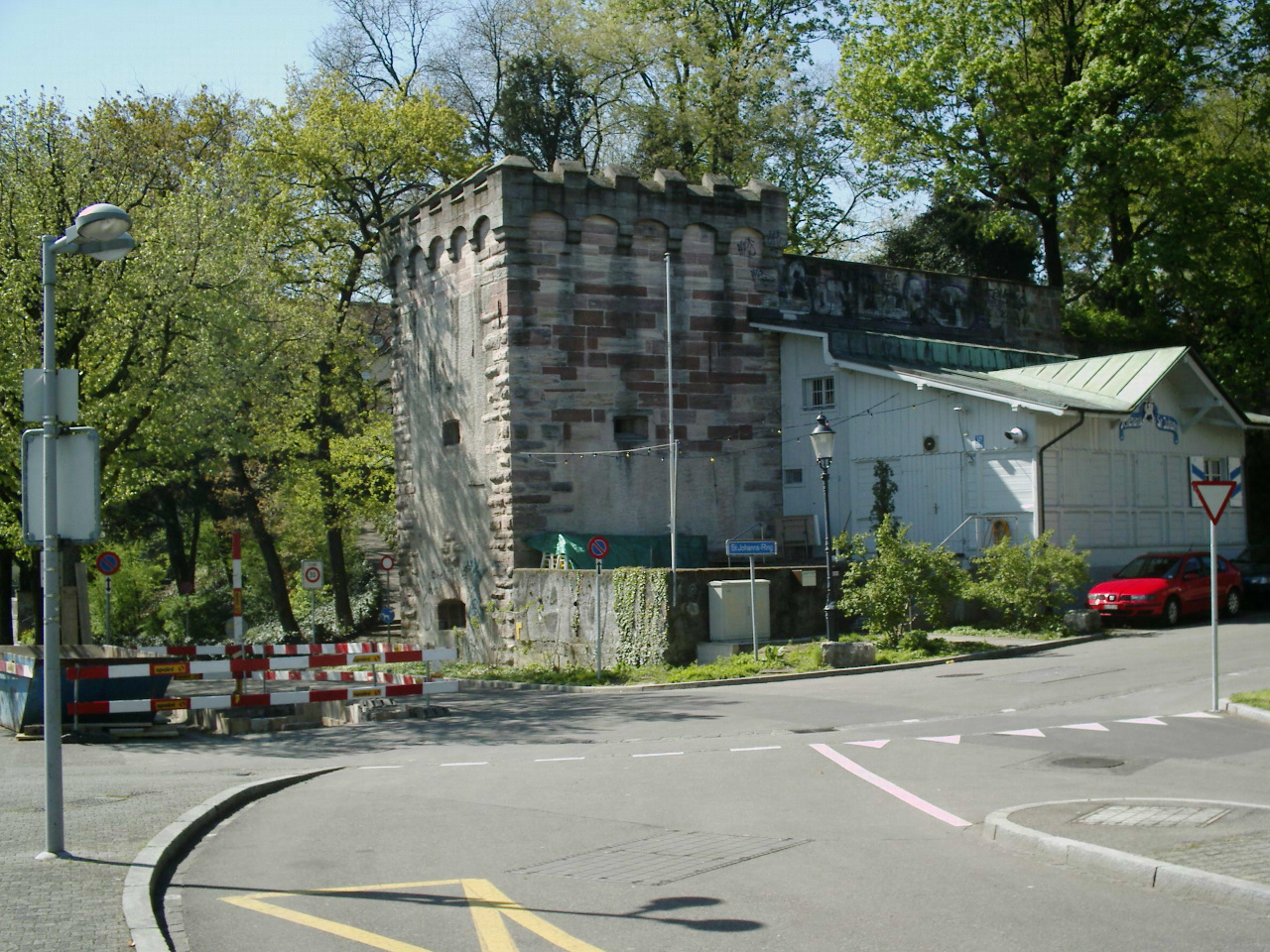
The ruins of the Thomasturm in spring 2005

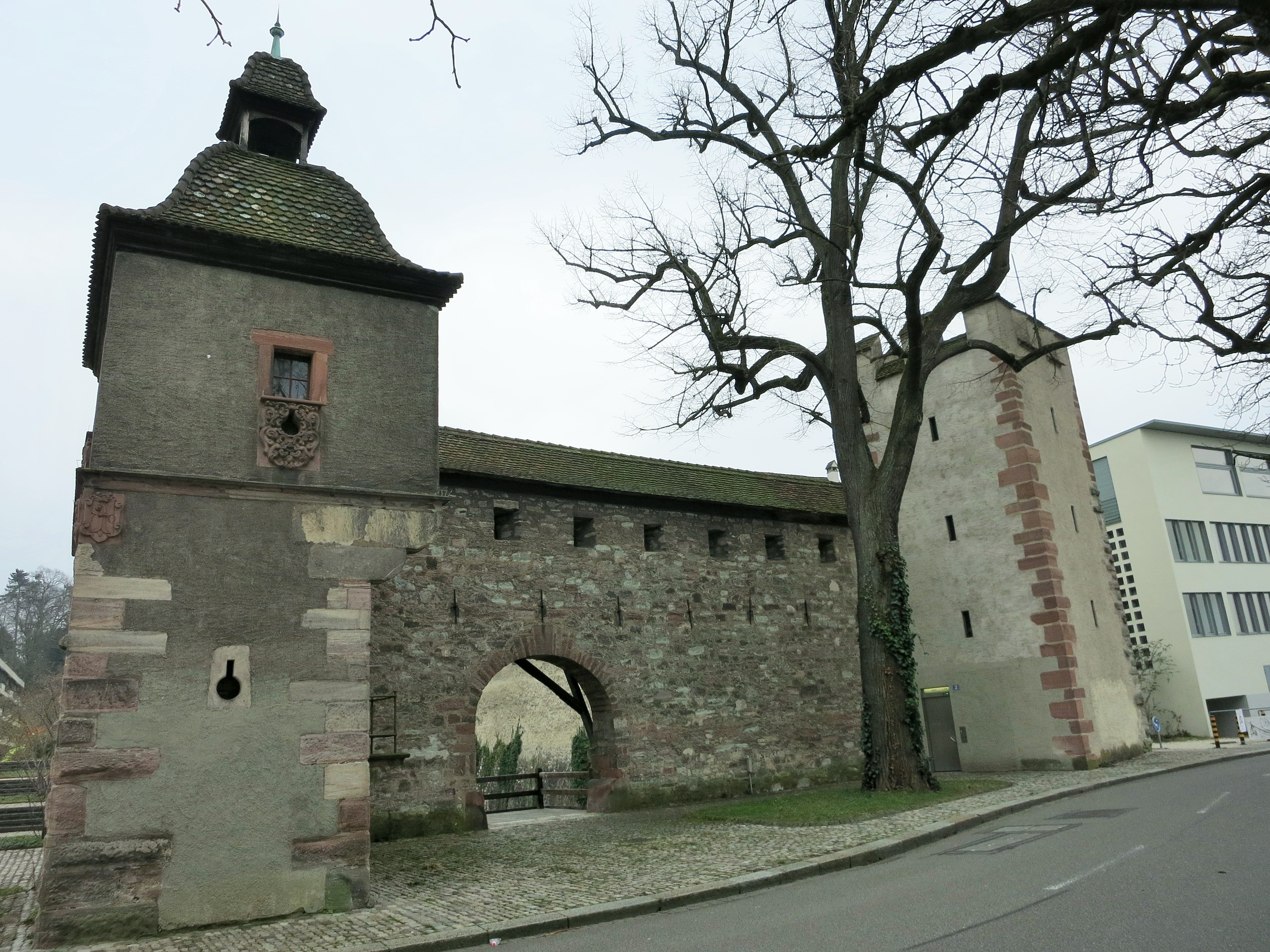
Letziturm

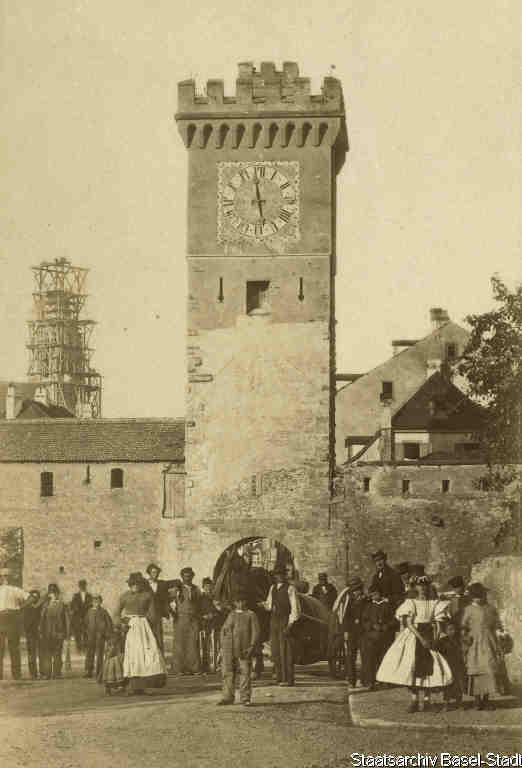
Steinentor in 1864

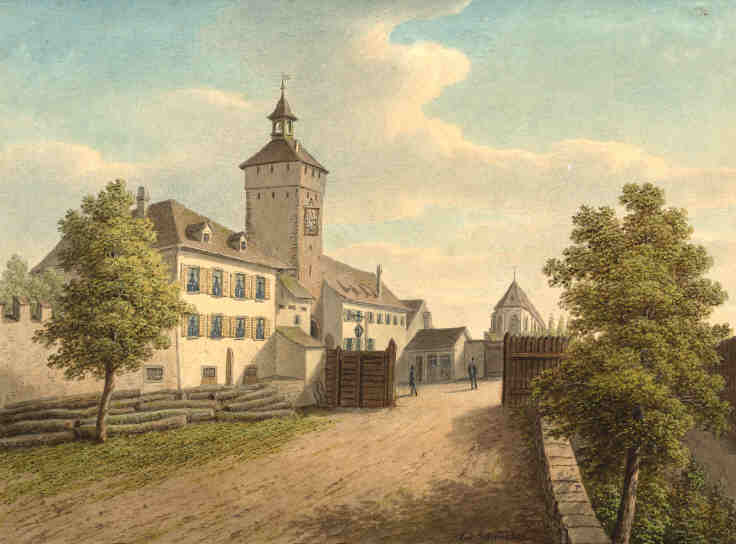
Bläsitor, around 1840

== See also ==
- 1356 Basel earthquake
