= Musical Instrument Museum (Volgograd) =

Museum of Musical Instruments of Evgeny Nikolaevich Pushkin
- Музей музыкальных инструментов Евгения Николаевича Пушкина
- Established: 1926 (precursors)

The Museum of Musical Instruments is a branch office of the Volgograd regional Museum of local lore. It began to form in 1926 as a private collection of musical instruments. During his life, Evgeny Nikolaevich Pushkin collected 262 unique musical instruments, which are currently in working condition. Due to the fact that the musician gave his collection to the city, all these instruments are now in the Museum.

== History ==
Evgeny was a veteran of the Great Patriotic War and was born in a village (near Saratov province) in March 1904. Gifted with a perfect musical ear, Evgeny collected and restored musical instruments. When he was young, Evgeny Nikolayevich learned to play the accordion - which evidently was his first instrument. One day, when his uncle forgot the accordion at his brother's house, he came back to find it the next morning and surprisingly found his seven-year-old nephew playing folk melodies, without a single mistake. His uncle immediately decided to gift the accordion to his nephew. According to his granddaughter — Lyudmila Kravchenko, Evgeny was able to master the tool in just one night.

== The Formation of the Collection ==
Before the war in 1926, Evgeny Nikolayevich began to collect art. He managed to collect about 30 musical instruments, among which there was even a Stradivari violin, but almost the entire collection was destroyed during the duration of the war. Only an Italian bayan, which was protected by Pushkin's family when he was at the front, survived. After the war, Evgeny Nikolayevich returned home and began to collect instruments once more. Years passed by and the collection grew to occupy two rooms in a small three-room house. Pushkin managed to collect 262 musical instruments, among which were: violins, guitars, bayans, accordions, balalaika, and piano. Some of these instruments are 150–200 years old, or even more. During his lifetime, Evgeny Nikolayevich was often called "doctor of music". Once he gave a rare instrument "Gavioli" — a mixture of harmonium and Ariston, and the harmony, the flute master could have restored himself, while having no prior instruction or experience of playing the instrument. It was also said that Pushkin could restore a unique instrument from the chips. He both repaired and modified instruments. His excellence and expertise with musical instruments is such that he in order not to wake his home, made a device that helped gently cover the strings to mute the sounds.

== About the museum ==
In 1986, Evgeny Nikolayevich presented his collection to Volgograd, putting forward the condition that only members of the Pushkin's family can work in the museum. Until his death, Evgeny Nikolayevich conducted tours in the Museum which was located in one room of his private house. He started excursions with a quote from The Great Soviet encyclopedia about the nature of sound as a physical phenomenon, and then began the story of his collection, showing individual exhibits. Visitors listened to the sound of different harmonies. The old mechanical piano from his museum "was shot" in the film of Sergey Bondarchuk "Red bells".

== See also ==
- List of music museums
