= Gundeldingen Castle =

Castle in Basel, Switzerland

- Basel
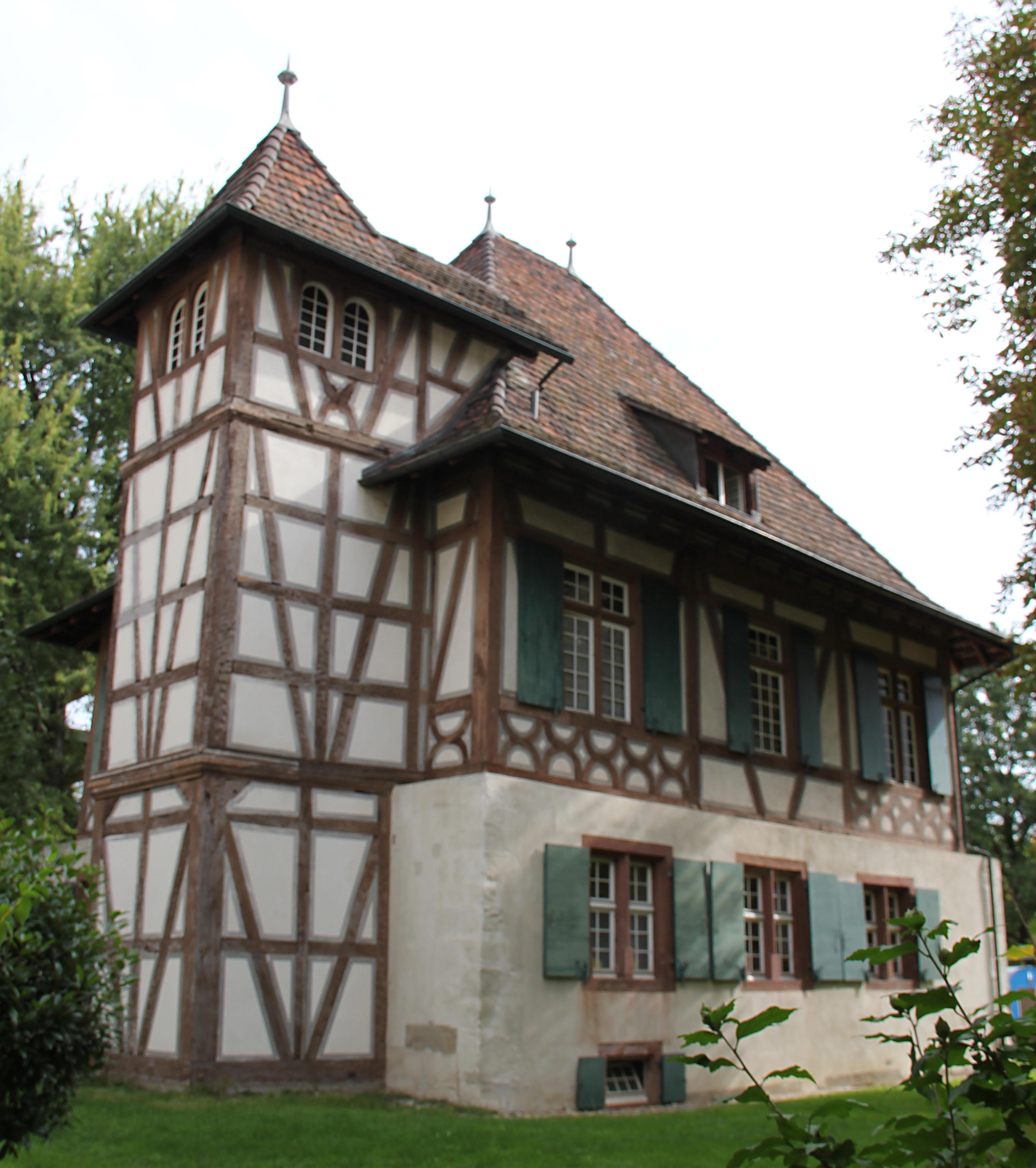
- Lower Middle Castle with half timbered stair tower and upper story

Site information
- Type: Manor House

Location
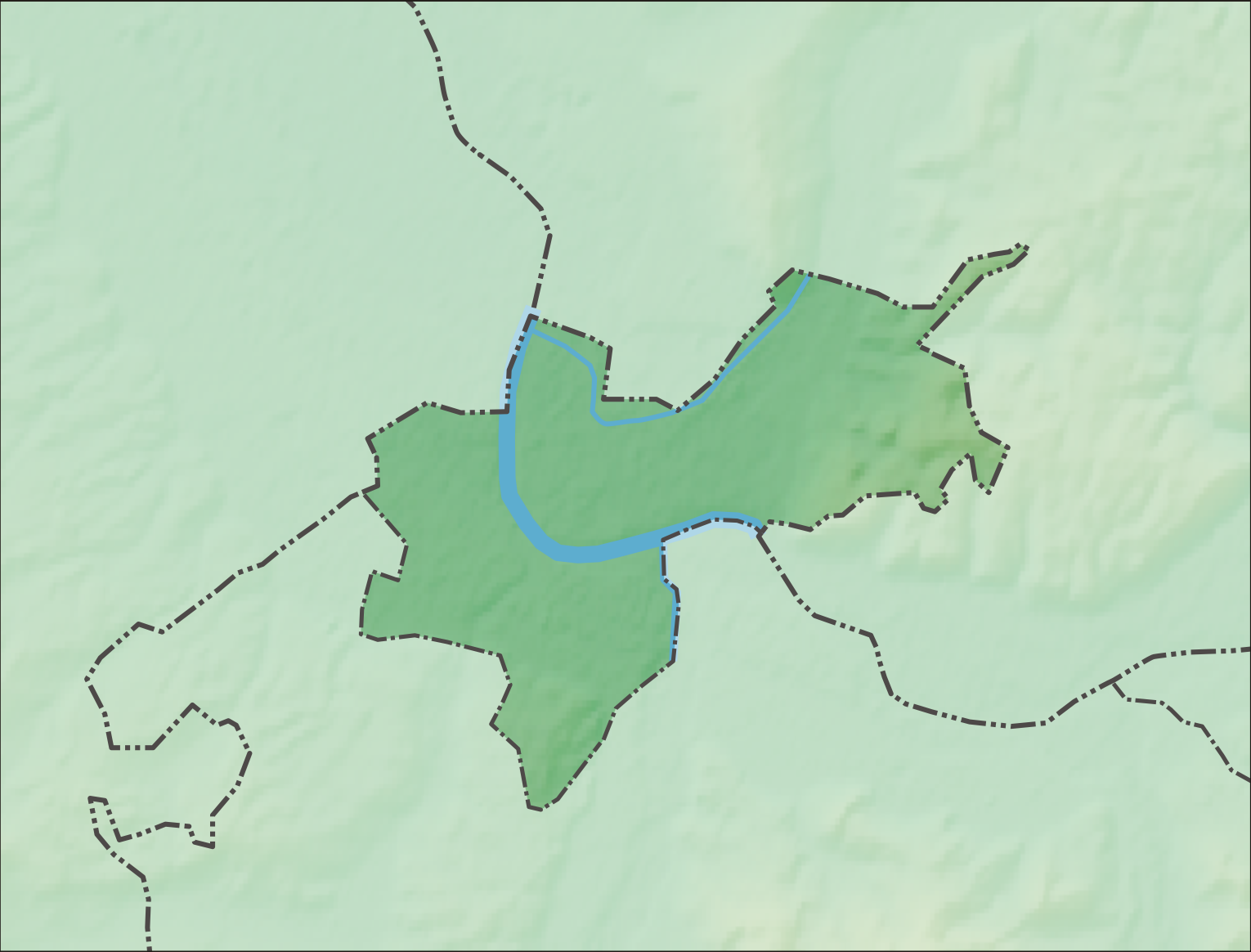
- Coordinates: 47.539944°N 7.592092°E

Site history
- Built: 14th century

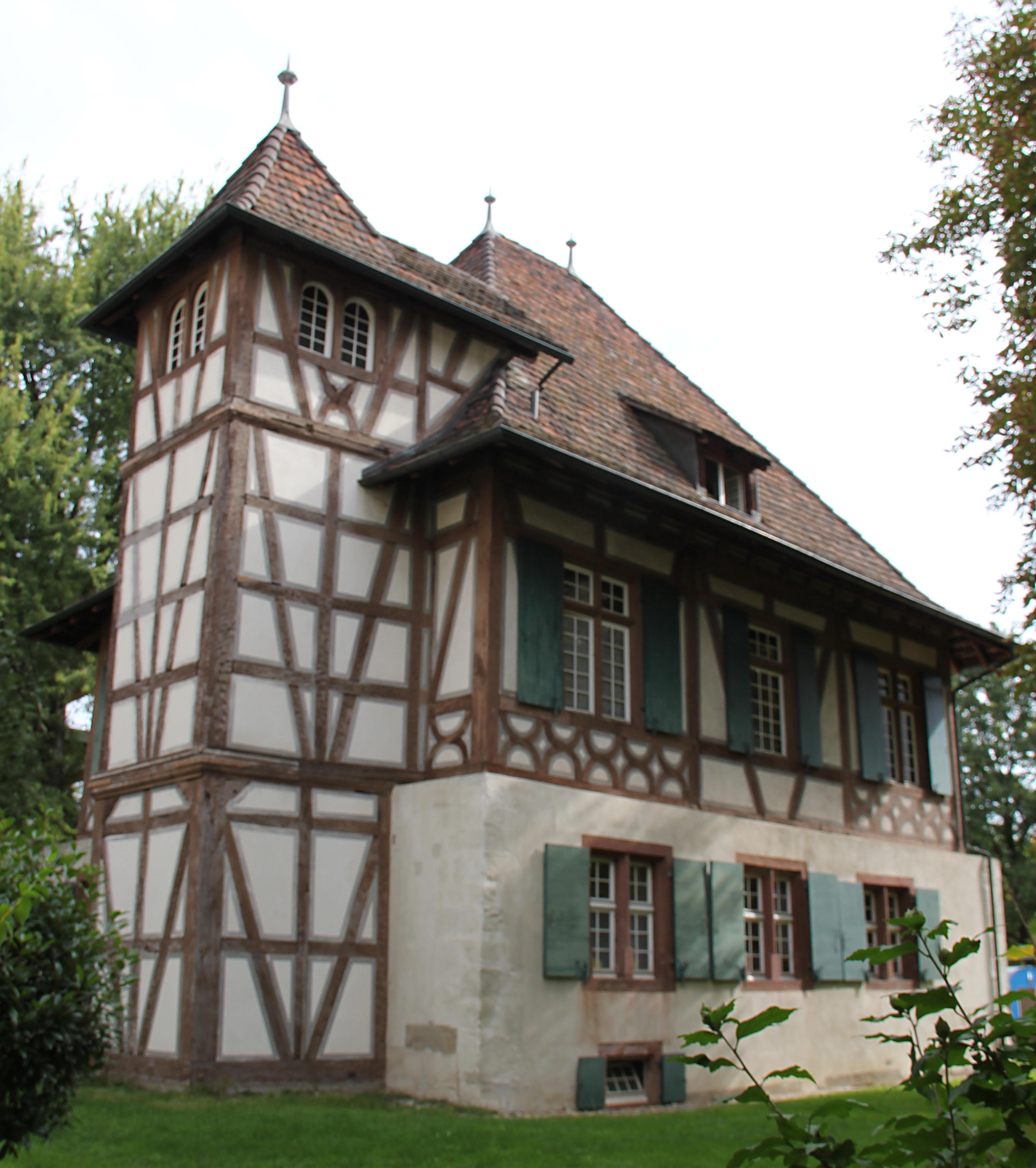
Lower Middle Castle with half timbered stair tower and upper story

Gundeldingen Castle is a castle in the Gundeldingen neighborhood of the municipality of Basel of the Canton of Basel-Stadt in Switzerland. It is a Swiss heritage site of national significance. Originally four related castles, today parts of only two remain.

== History ==
=== Inner castle ===
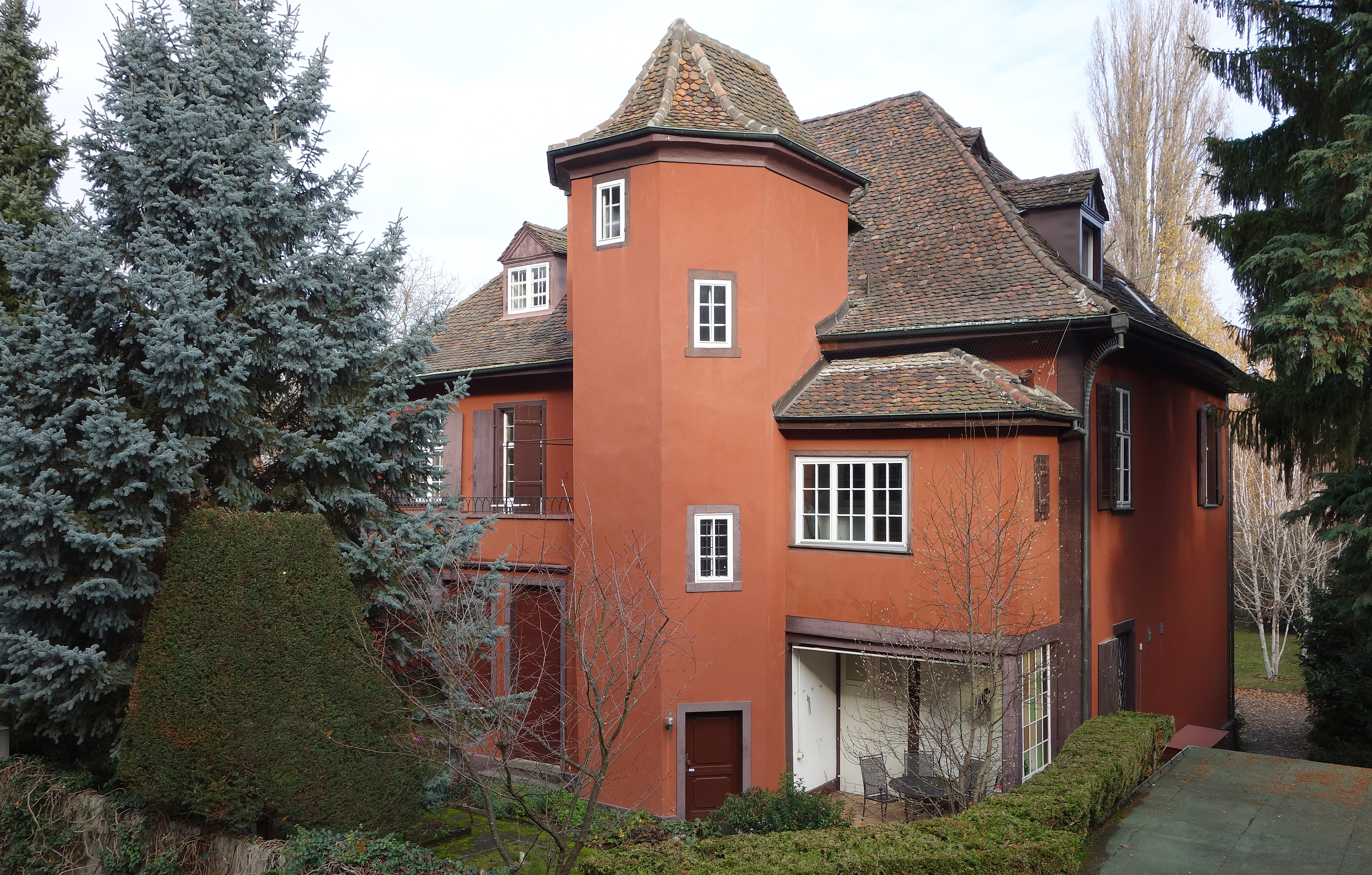
Inner castle at Dittingerstrasse 20

The Front or Inner Castle (Vorderes oder Inneres Gundeldingen) was built during the 16th century as a manor house for a wealthy merchant. Over the following centuries it was owned by a number of wealthy families. The manor was the center of a large country estate and for over two centuries was surrounded by a large garden and duck pond. The main building was first painted red about 250 years ago, beginning a tradition that lasts until today. Only the main building remains at Dittingerstrasse 20.

=== Lower middle castle ===
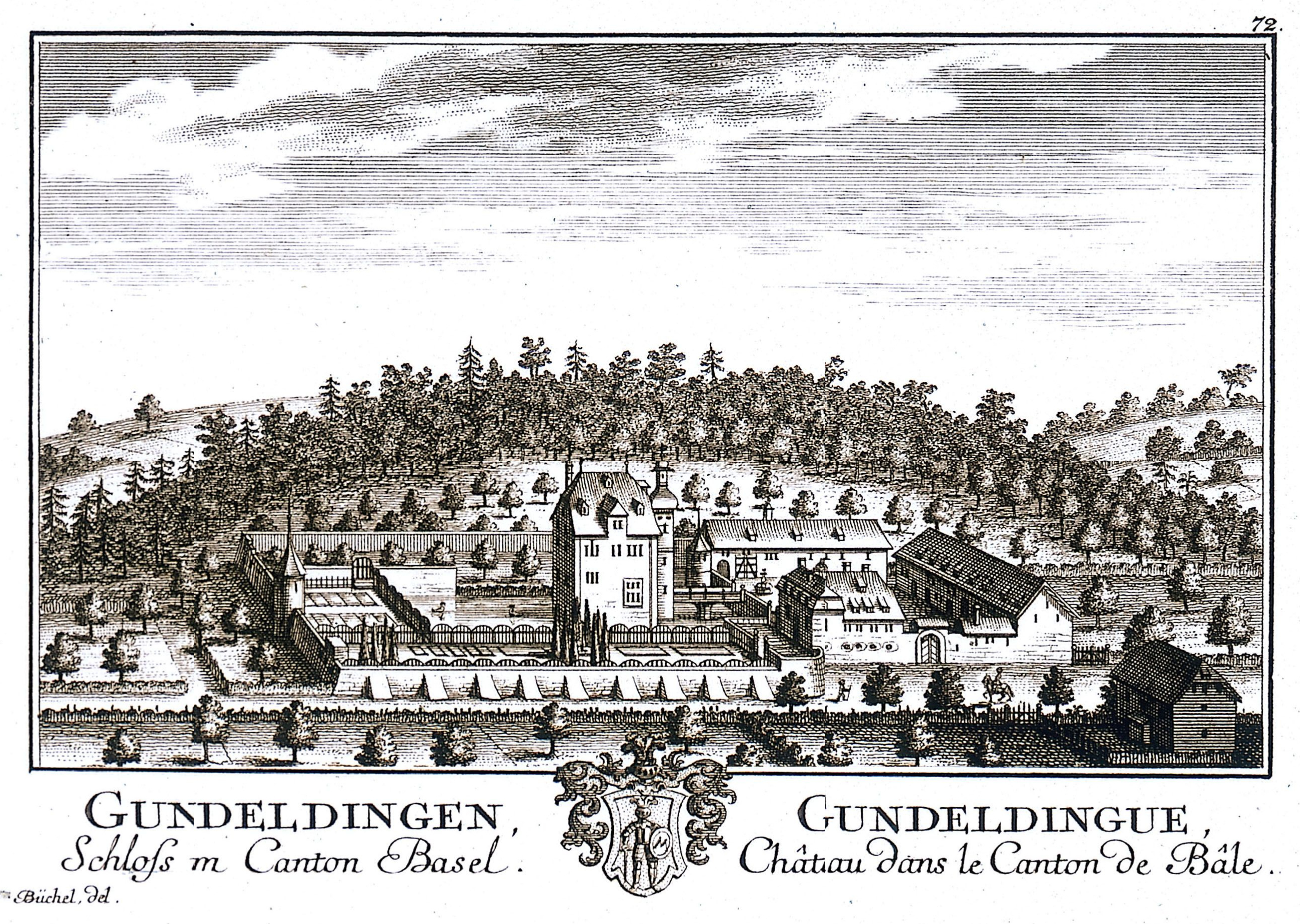
Lower Middle Castle in 1754

Further down Gundeldinger street is the Lower Middle Castle (Unteres Mittleres Gundeldingen). This castle was built around 1400 and was originally surrounded by a pond. In 1344 it was recorded as having been owned by Konrad Matzerer, a deceased lay brother of the nearby Saint Alban Monastery. In 1401, Agnes von Dornach combined the Lower and Upper Middle Castles into a single estate. However, after her death in 1415 the Lower Castle was inherited by the Schermann family of Basel. The castle changed hands several times before it was acquired by Thomas Platter in 1549. Platter was the first rector of the Basel Gymnasium. Platter renovated and repaired the dilapidated building until his death in 1582. An exterior stair tower was added in 1674. After over a century of changing ownership, in 1704 Hans Jakob Merian acquired both middle castles. After passing through several other owners, in 1842 the Lower Middle Castle was sold by the heirs of Samuel Hartmann to the city hospital. It was used by the hospital until 1958 when the dilapidated building was sold to the city. Plans to demolish it were cancelled when in 1965 a committee was established to repair and maintain the building. Following a total renovation, the main building reopened in 1974. Since that time, the building has housed government and private offices.

=== Upper middle castle ===
The Upper Middle Castle was the oldest of the four castles. It was built in the mid-14th century and was first mentioned in 1377 as a fief granted by Saint Alban Monastery to the knightly von Ramstein family. The castle was surrounded by battlements and a moat until about the 16th century. It was owned by the monastery until 1470, though it was held by a number of local nobles. After 1470 it passed through a number of owners until it was acquired by the Platter family. In the 19th century it was demolished to make way for a brewery.

=== Outer castle ===
The Large or Outer Castle (Grosses oder Äusseres Gundeldingen) was built at the end of the 14th century. In 1508 it was acquired by the wealthy Jacob Meyer, who paid 350 Rhenish guilder for it. In 1529 he sold the castle and its extensive lands to Jörg Supersaxo of Valais. But Jörg died before he could move into the castle. After passing through other owners, in 1610 Theobald Ryff bought it as a summer residence. Theobald's son sold it in 1660 to the lawyer Felix Platter. Platter first reported that there was a chalybeate or iron bearing mineral spring on the estate lands. In 1704 the mineral spring was recommended by the physician Theodor Zwinger (1658-1724). While a planned mineral spa was never built, the springs were used and piped into Basel until about 1800. After the extinction of the Platter line in the early 18th century, the castle passed through a number of owners. From 1917 until 1953 it was a shelter and girls' home for the Salvation Army. After 1953 it was demolished to make way for an apartment block at Gundeldingerstrasse 446.

== See also ==
- List of castles in Switzerland
