= Music Museum (Basel) =

Museum in Basel, Switzerland

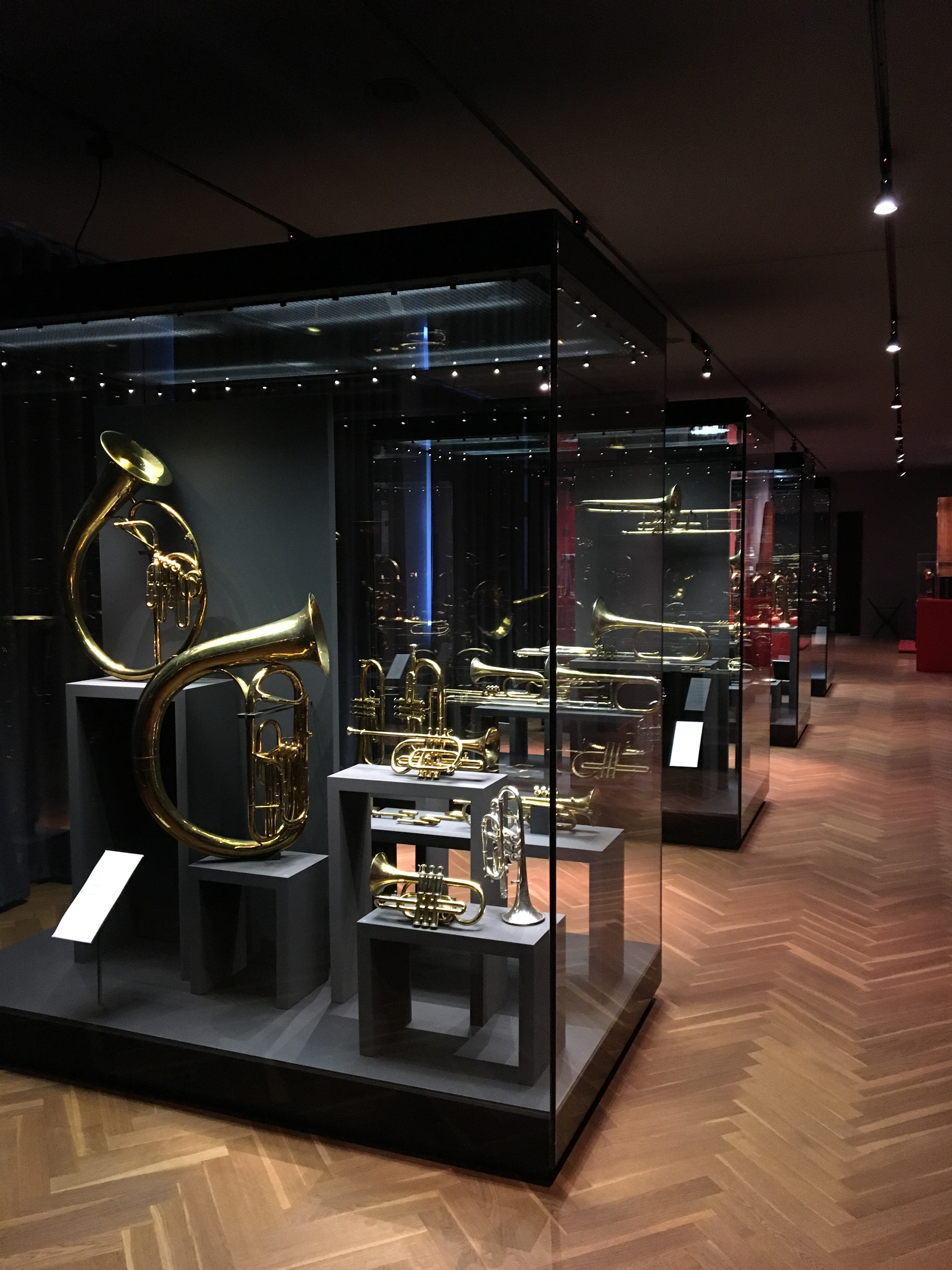
Temporary exhibit hall housing recent brass instruments

The Music Museum is located in Basel, Switzerland and houses the country's largest collection of musical instruments. The museum is one of three components of Historisches Museum Basel. It presents five centuries of music history with three areas a) the history of music-making in Basel, b) concerts, choral music and dance, and c) parades, festivals and signals.

== History ==
The museum was opened in its current capacity in 2000. It forms part of a building complex whose oldest elements date back to the monastery of the Augustinian order around 1206. It was later used as a municipal builder's yard and given the name Lohnhof. The museum retains traces of its varied history, most notably from its time as a prison from 1835 till 1995; its prison cells serve as exhibition rooms.

The instruments were not housed in their own discrete museum until 1957, although the collection began in 1862 when an organ came into the Medieval Collection. By 1894, Barfüsserkirche had been opened as the Historiches Museum Basel, and approximately 70 instruments were on display. Due to lack of space, the collection grew and spent time between many different storage areas, finally gaining its own title of "Musikinstrumenten-Sammlung" at the end of the 1980s.

Musikmuseum is a Swiss heritage site of national significance.

== Collection and exhibits ==
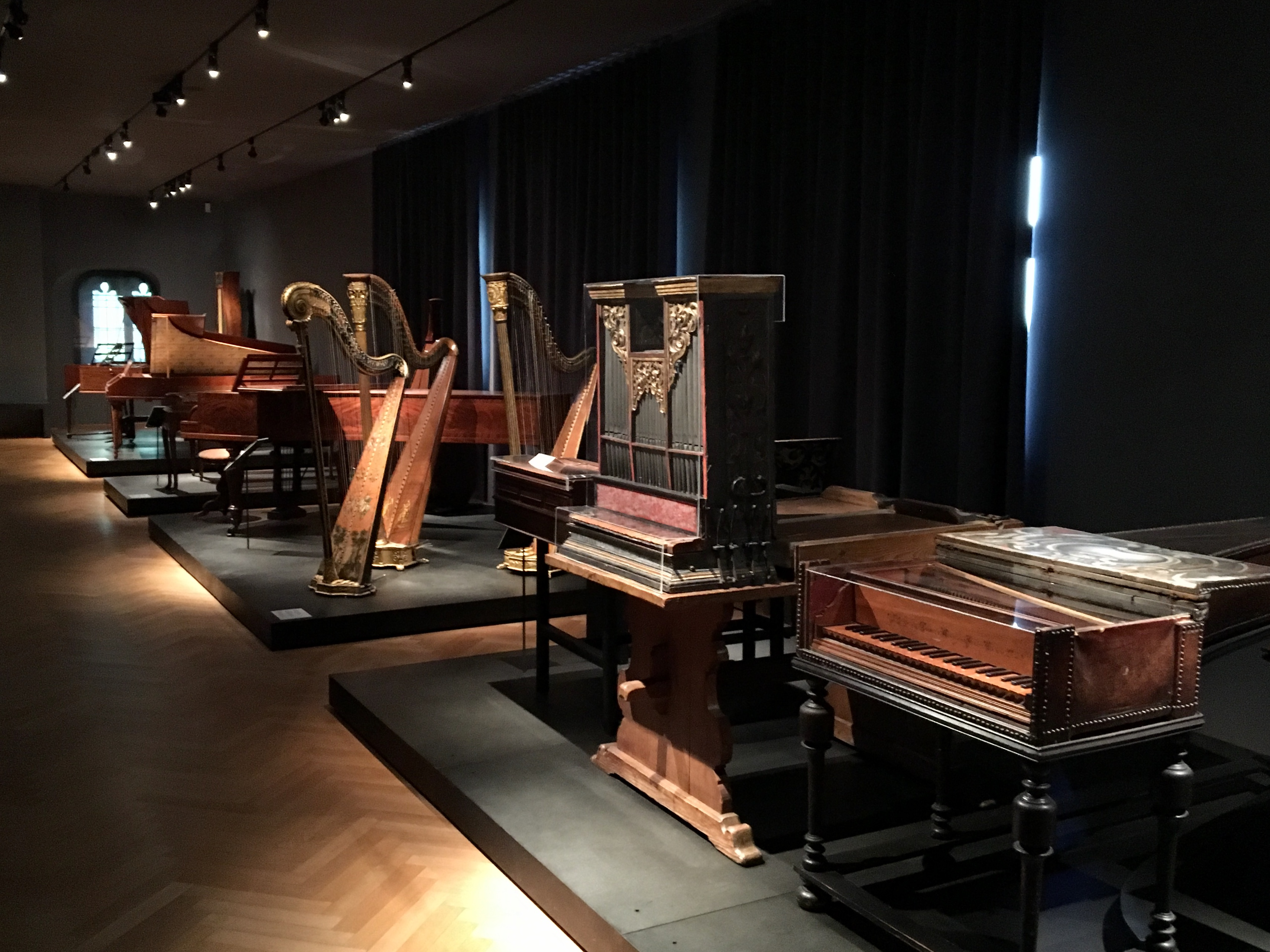
An exhibition hall with several important antique keyboard instruments

The collection surpasses 3,000 instruments from the 15th through the 20th century, with the permanent exhibition displaying around 650. Among the notable pieces of the collection are the famous Ab Yberg organ, a bass viola da gamba made by Joachim Tielke, and a 1572 virginal from the Netherlands.

It is arranged over three floors. Each cell contains a specific theme, be it a type of instrument or a socially-informed topic. Visitors can hear audio excerpts of the instruments via a multimedia information system—available in German, French, and English—stationed in each room.

=== Music in Basel ===
This floor sheds light on the many different musical activities that have been an integral part of life in Basel since the 16th century. The exhibits here range from instruments used only on ceremonial occasions, such as drums and fanfare trumpets, to objects associated with Basel’s many different music societies and Fasnacht festivities. Another cell is devoted to the 20th-century revival of early music, in which Basel played a large role. On show in the main exhibition space are several historical keyboard instruments that were made—or at least played—in Basel. A number of paintings, among them a large-format allegory of music from the 16th century and two oil paintings by local artist Joseph Esperlin (1757), show scenes of music-making in Basel. One of the rooms is a "Spielraum," (English: play-room) where guests of all ages are able to experiment with hands-on activities and inner workings of various instruments.

=== Concerts, Chorale, and Dance ===
This floor features European musical instruments in their specific musical contexts from 15th to the 20th century. One cell is devoted to Baroque chamber music, for example, while another tells the story of the saxophone and its inventor, Adolph Sax. Others contain wind, stringed and bowed instruments to provide insight into the extraordinarily varied world of music.

=== Parades, Marches, and Signals ===
This floor describes the famous collection of historical brass instruments and drums, which H. C. Wilhelm Bernoulli-Preiswerk bequeathed to the museum in 1980. Drawn from all over Europe, the exhibits illustrate both the sizeable variety of instruments in existence and how they have evolved over the centuries. They range from simple, natural objects to sophisticated contraptions, and from military signals to instruments reserved for fanfares and parades.

The top floor of the museum contains a large, multi-purpose hall for educational seminars, musical performances, and other events.

== Location and accessibility ==
The address of the museum is Im Lohnhof 9, 4051 Basel. The museum is situated in the heart of the Old Town, above Barfüsserplatz. The closest tram stop is Musik Akademie on tram line 3, and the museum is wheelchair-accessible by use of elevator.

== See also ==
- List of music museums
- Basel Historical Museum
- Other museums in Basel
- Musical Instrument Museum
