= Antikenmuseum Basel und Sammlung Ludwig =

Archaeological museum in Basel (Switzerland)

Coordinates: 47.554379°N 7.593251°E

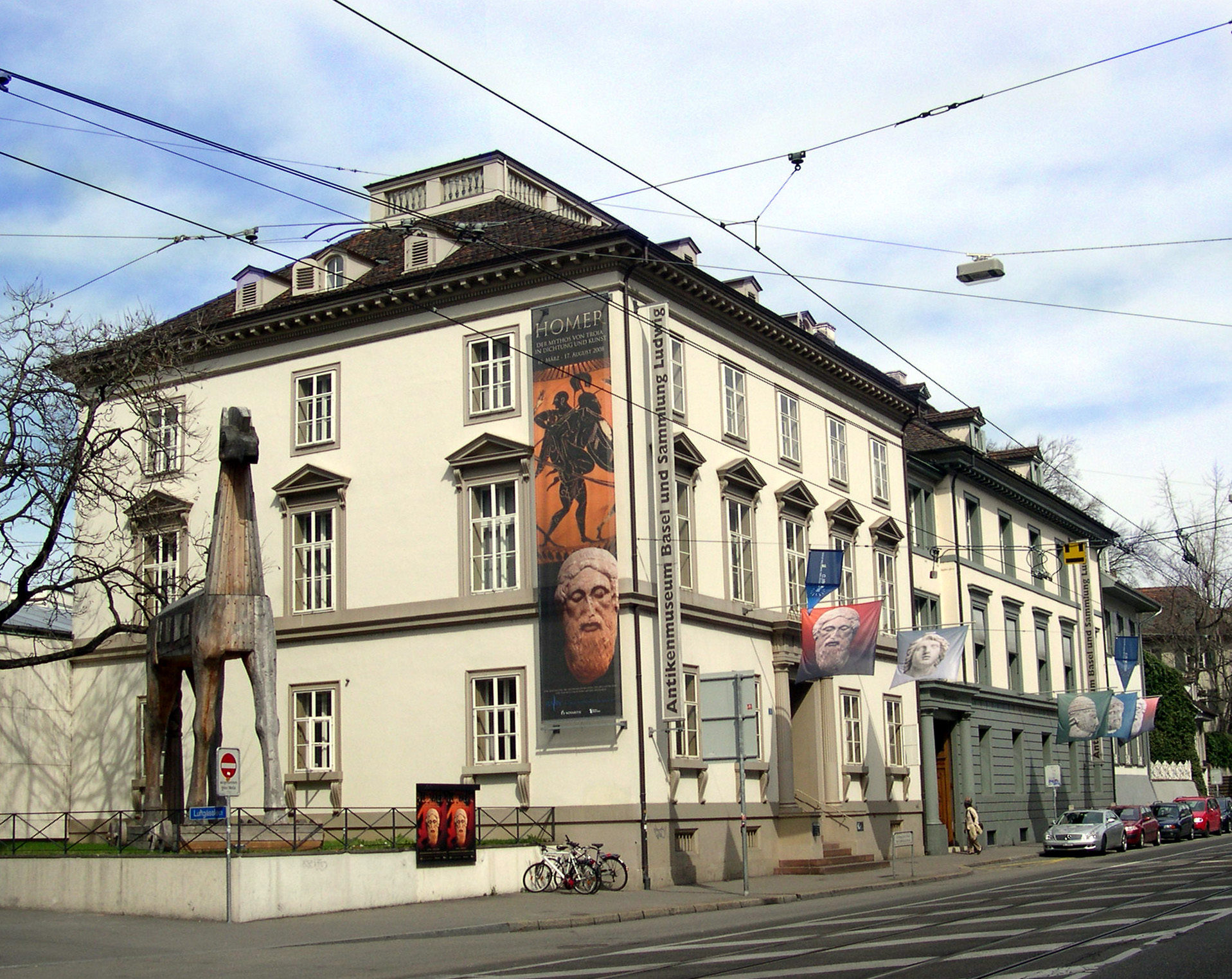
Antikenmuseum Basel und Sammlung Ludwig

The Antikenmuseum Basel und Sammlung Ludwig (Basel Museum of Ancient Art and Ludwig Collection) is one of the many museums in the city of Basel, Switzerland and a heritage site of national significance. In 1961 the city of Basel decided to establish the museum to assemble the several antiquities in one place.

== Buildings ==
It is located in several neighboring buildings, most prominently two designed by Melchior Berri in the early 19th century. One was desgnied for Johann Jakob Bachofen-Merian, the father to Johann Jakob Bachofen and the other for the Swiss merchant Isaac Iselin-Roulet. During several years the buildings were renovated and the museum was inaugurated in 1966. Initially the museum included only one of the two Berri buildings, the one constructed for Roulet, the other one being used by the cities Civil Register. In 1986 the also the building built for the Bachofen family, became a part of the museum. During several years the buildings were renovated and the museum was inaugurated in 1966. Having opened with about 650 m^{2} of exhibition room, until 1992 it has expanded to 3000 m^{2.}

== Collection ==
The museum is devoted exclusively to the art of ancient civilizations from the 4th millennium BC to the 7th century AD. The only one of its kind in Switzerland, the museum shows works of art from the Mediterranean region, predominantly from the period from 1000 BC to 300 AD. A central position is occupied by the collection of Greek vases and sculptures and the Ancient Egyptian section. Further objects are from the Near East and Cyprus.

== See also ==
- Museums in Basel
- List of museums in Switzerland
