= Lukas Vischer (collector) =

Lukas Vischer (1780–1840) was an amateur artist, traveler, and collector from Basel, Switzerland. During a nine-year residence in Mexico he assembled a notable collection of ancient Mexican sculptures and ceramics. Vischer's collection eventually formed a significant part of the holdings of the Museum of Cultures Basel. It has been called one of the best European collections of pre-Columbian or Mesoamerican artifacts.

Before settling in Mexico, Vischer traveled for several years in the United States and Canada, keeping a diary and sketchbook. His 1824 portraits of Creek Indians have been of particular interest to scholars. Selections from Vischer's diary, concerning visits to Washington, D.C., and the Creek Indians, have been translated into English.
