= Basel Historical Museum =

- Historisches Museum Basel
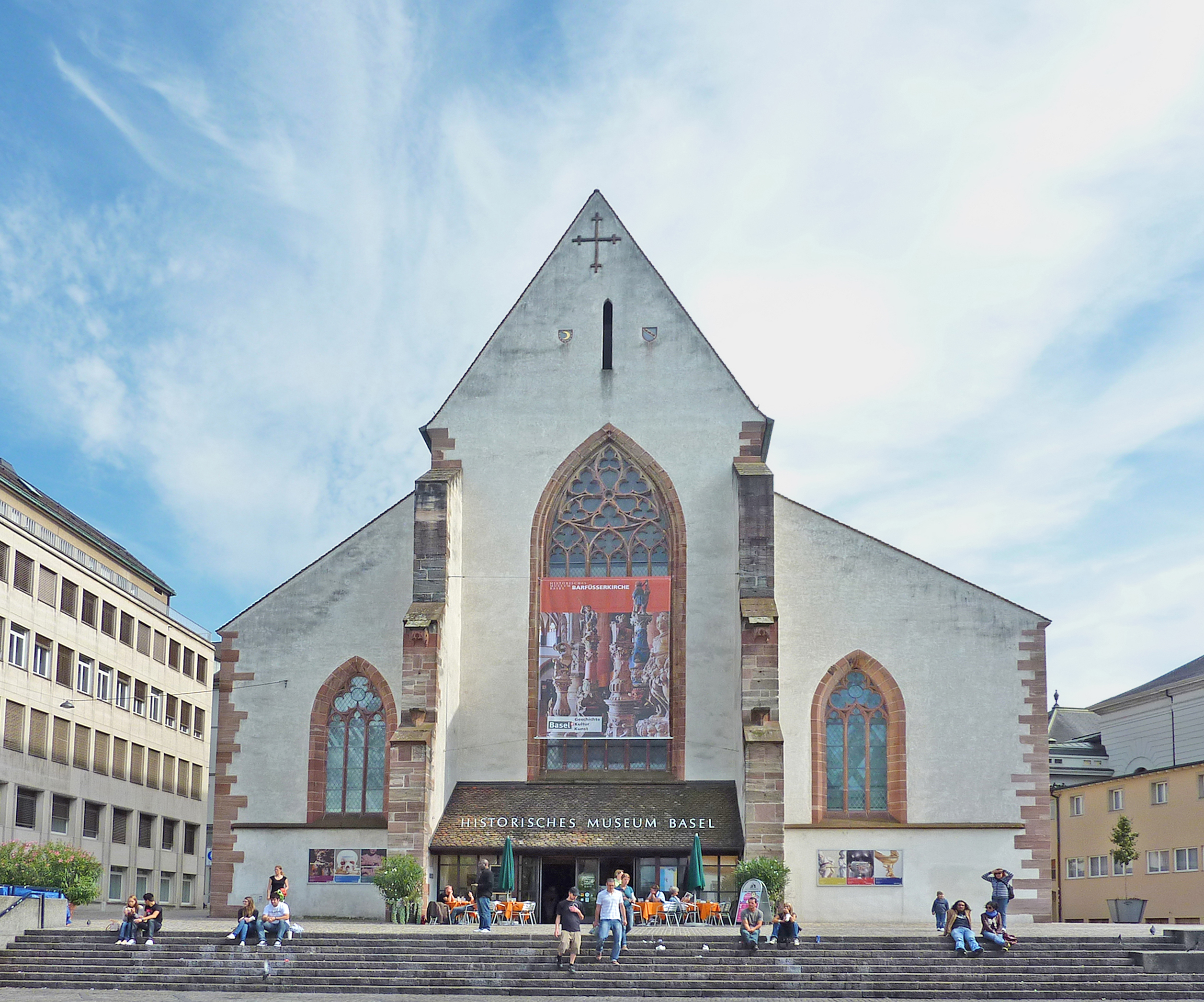
- The Barfüsserkirche

- Location within Switzerland
- Established: 1894
- Location: Basel, Switzerland
- Coordinates: 47°33′16″N 7°35′26″E
- Type: History museum
- Website: www.hmb.ch

The Basel Historical Museum (German: Historisches Museum Basel) is one of the largest and most important museums of its kind in Switzerland and a heritage site of national significance. It opened in 1894. The museum is divided into three buildings within the city of Basel: the Barfüsserkirche, Haus zum Kirschgarten and Musikmuseum.

== Barfüsserkirche ==
=== Location and history ===
The main part of the museum is located in the Barfüsserkirche (literally 'Barefeet Church') in the centre of the city of Basel. The Barfüsserkirche is a former Franciscan church with its origins in the 13th century. In 1529, during the Protestant Reformation, the site was given to the city. It was then used for multiple purposes, including as a hospital, school, and warehouse. The church was used for worship until 1794. From 1890 to 1894, the church was renovated to house the city's new Historical Museum.

On 20 October 1975, workers discovered a brick-walled grave chamber in front of the choir, containing the mummified corpse of a woman. She was identified as Anna Catharina Bischoff and turned out to be an ancestor of Boris Johnson.

=== Items in the exhibition ===
The museum houses the Upper Rhine's most comprehensive cultural history collection and the display area covers 6,200 square meters. The exhibition presents objects documenting handicraft traditions and everyday culture from ages past. Its focus is on the late Middle Ages and the Renaissance up to the Baroque period. Leading highlights include: the treasury of the Basel Cathedral, the Basel and Strasbourg tapestries, the fragments of Basel's dance of death, altars and ecclesiastical graphic works, the estate of Erasmus of Rotterdam, the coin cabinet and glass painting. The museum also preserves old cabinets of curiosities which have been bequeathed, as Amerbach cabinet and Faesch cabinet, which works great collectors Basel sixteenth and seventeenth century.

=== Management ===
The museum is managed by the canton of Basel-City. Its origins lie with the Amerbach family in the 16th century whose Wunderkammer was bought by Basel 1661 and brought to the public 1671. The cultural history objects of this Wunderkammer, together with the ones of other collections, became the Historisches Museum Basel in 1894.

== Haus zum Kirschgarten ==
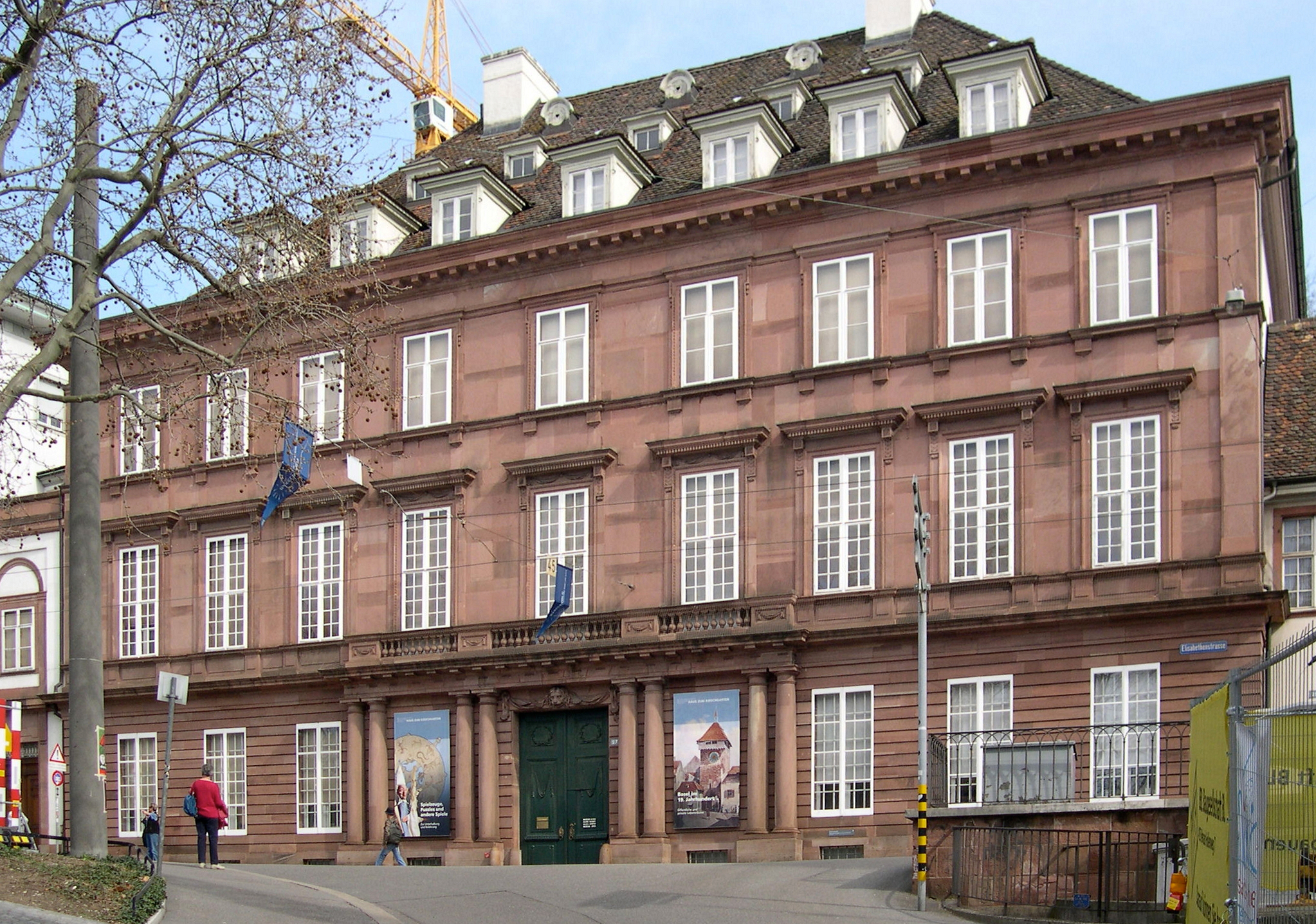
Basel Historical Museum - Haus zum Kirschgarten.

=== Location and history ===
The Haus zum Kirschgarten (House to the Cherry garden) was built between 1775 and 1780 for Johann Rudolf Burckhardt, a silk ribbon manufacturer. The architect was Johann Ulrich Büchel. The mansion attests to the wealth and status of the Burckhardt family and is a tour de force of early Neoclassical style, influenced in part by Masonic concepts. Burckhardt sold the house in 1797. In 1951, a museum on domestic culture was installed.

=== Items in the exhibition ===
Most of the 50 exhibition rooms are devoted to the 18th and 19th century period rooms formerly inhabited by Basel's bourgeoisie. Some of the period rooms in the mansion are original or contain interiors and furnishings from comparable mansions elsewhere in Basel and give visitors a vivid impression of how Basel's wealthy residents actually lived in the past. Shown are varying furnitures, paintings, porcelain, antique toys and an extended watch and clock collection, as well as a collection of scientific instruments.

== Musikmuseum ==
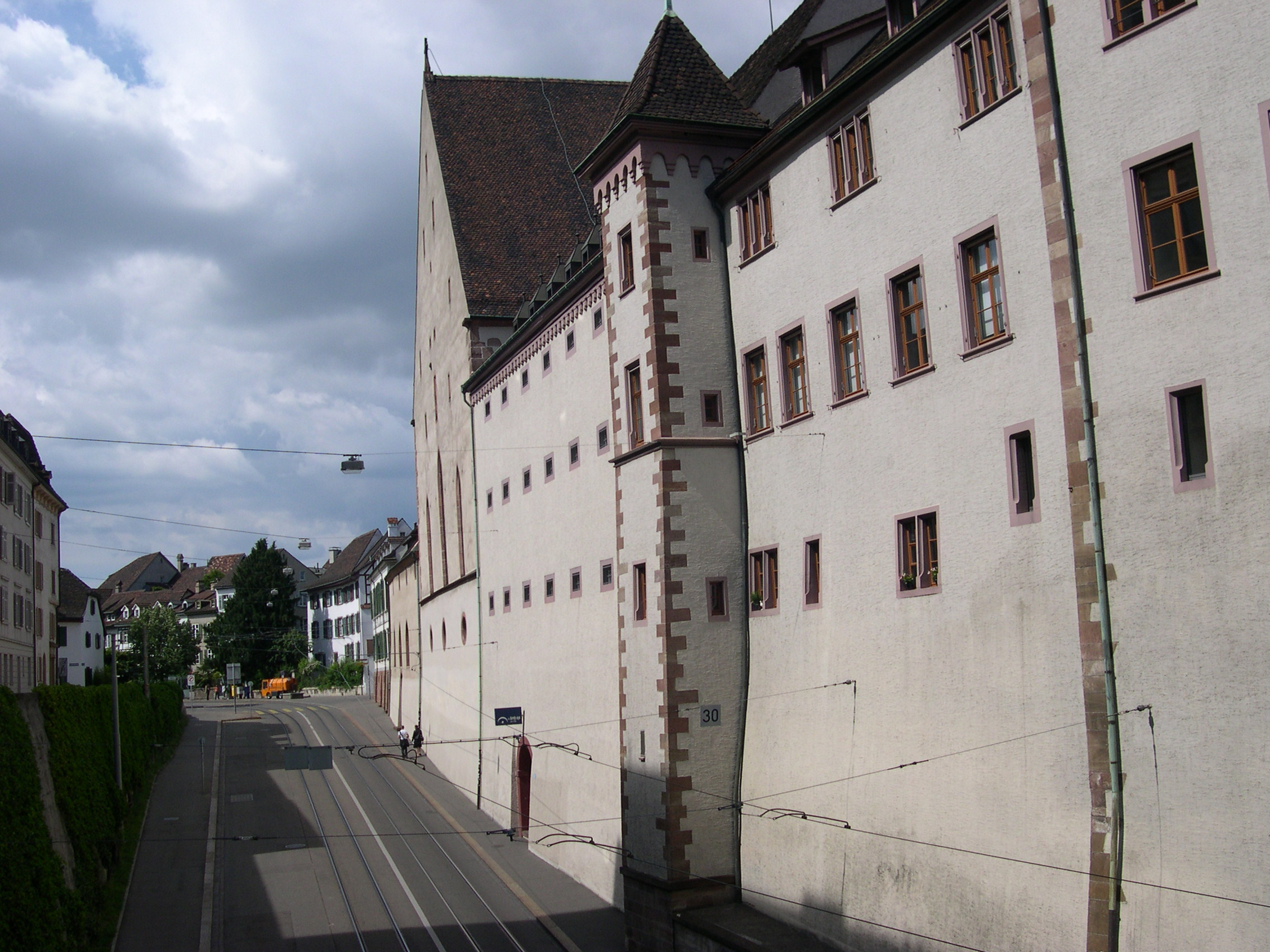
"Lohnhof" building housing the music museum.

=== Location and history ===
The Musikmuseum is situated over the Barfüsserplatz, opposite the Barfüsserkirche. It is located on the site of a former prison.

=== Items in the exhibition ===
The 24 cells of the former prison serve as showcases for Switzerland's largest collection of musical instruments, circa 650 european instruments spread over three floors and spanning five centuries of music history. The collection covers: music in Basel, ceremonial music, music in humanist circles, ancient music in modern times and music societies.

== See also ==
- Museums in Basel
- List of museums in Switzerland
