= Cartoonmuseum Basel – Centre for Narrative Art =

Museum in Switzerland

Coordinates: 47.554474°N 7.596346°E

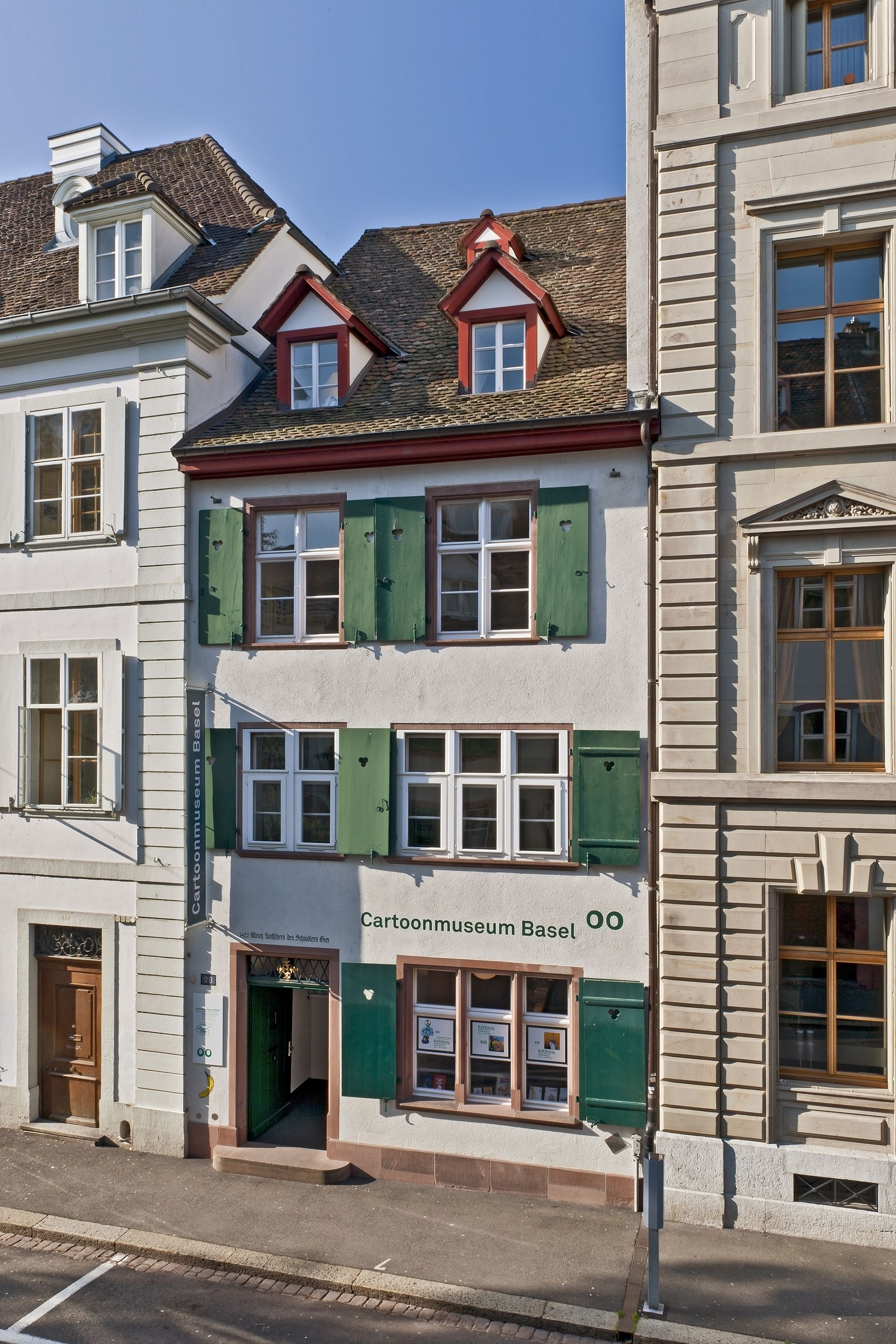
Outside view Cartoonmuseum Basel

Cartoonmuseum Basel is the only museum and centre of excellence in Switzerland devoted exclusively to the art of narrative drawing, be it in comics, graphic novels, comics reportage, cartoons, satirical drawings or animated films. It collects individual works, curates exhibitions and shares knowledge about the genre. The museum contributes to the debate about the art of narrative drawing, and about the social and political issues it addresses.

The museum possesses a substantial collection of over 10,000 original drawings by renowned national and international artists. The museum’s focus lies on curated exhibitions displaying the works of a single artist or illustrating a specific theme. The exhibitions are supplemented by a wide range of art-education activities, such as guided tours, workshops and talks.

A museum library contains primary and secondary literature on the caricature, cartoon and comic, and presents a broad spectrum of popular and alternative culture and subculture. The museum shop offers a wide range of postcards, selected monographs, cartoon books and comic books, adapted to suit the respective exhibition.

== Collection history and building ==
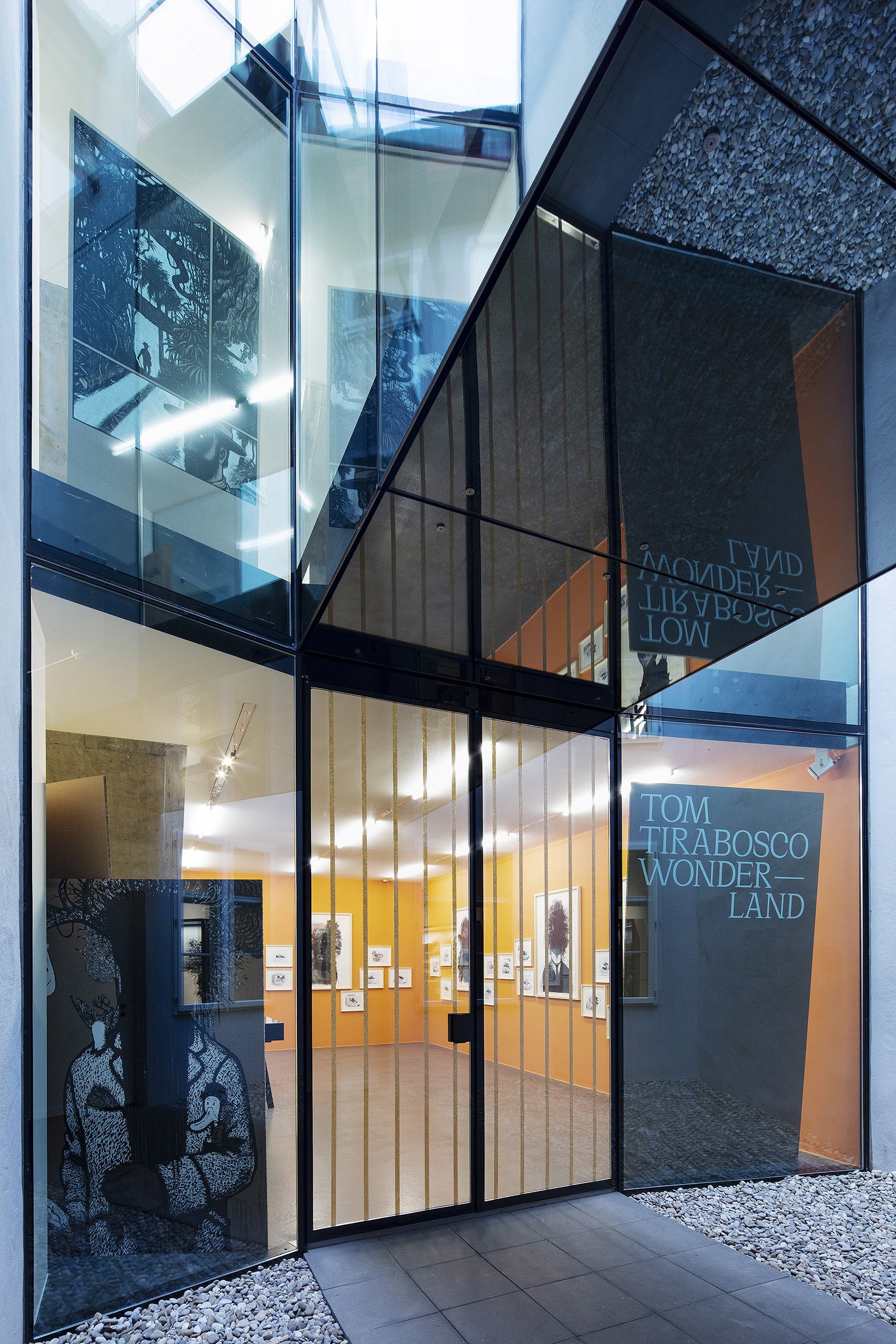
Passage from old to new building

Cartoonmuseum Basel’s founder and benefactor was Dieter Burckhardt (1914–1991), an important patron from a well-to-do Basel family, who wanted to make his private collection of caricatures and cartoons accessible to a wider audience. In 1979, he founded the foundation Stiftung Sammlung Karikaturen & Cartoons, which has been managed by the larger Christoph Merian Stiftung ever since. In 1980, the first exhibition opened at St. Alban-Vorstadt 9 under the name of Karikatur & Cartoon Museum Basel. The museum’s collection is enlarged on a regular basis, be it through the acquisition of selected works or the absorption of entire collections.

The museum is located on the historic street St. Alban-Vorstadt in Basel. In 1991, the foundation bought the building at St. Alban-Vorstadt 28, which was subsequently restored and extended by Herzog & de Meuron Architects. In May 1996, the new Karikatur & Cartoon Museum Basel was opened to the public. In 2009, it was renamed Cartoonmuseum Basel.

== Exhibitions (selection) ==
- 2008/2009 Sempé
- 2011 Ralf König. Gottes Werk und Königs Beitrag
- 2012 Winsor Mc Cay. Comics, Filme, Träume
- 2012/2013 Comics Deluxe! Das Comicmagazin Strapazin
- 2013/2014 Die Abenteuer der Ligne claire. Der Fall Herr G. & Co.
- 2014/2015 Joost Swarte. Zeichner und Gestalter
- 2015/2016 Joe Sacco. Comics Journalist
- 2016 Aline Kominsky-Crumb & Robert Crumb. Drawn Together
- 2016/2017 dr. Zep & mr. Titeuf
- 2017 Christoph Niemann. That’s How!
- 2017/2018 Lorenzo Mattotti. Imago
- 2018/2019 Le Monde de Tardi
- 2019 Joann Sfar. Sans début ni fin
- 2020/2021 Brecht Evens. Night Animals

== Publications (selection) ==
- How to Love. Graphic Novellas by Actus Comics. Cartoonmuseum Basel (Hg.). Christoph Merian Verlag, 2011, ISBN 978-3-85616-541-3
- Comics Deluxe! Das Comicmagazin Strapazin. Cartoonmuseum Basel (Hg.). Christoph Merian Verlag, 2012, ISBN 978-3-85616-577-2
- Joost Swarte. Zeichner und Gestalter. Anette Gehrig (Hg.). Cartoonmuseum Basel. 2014, ISBN 978-3-033-04806-5
- Zeichner als Reporter. Joe Sacco. Comics Journalismus. Pierre Thomé, Anette Gehrig, Yves Noyau (Hg.). Christoph Merian Verlag, 2015, ISBN 978-3-85616-671-7
- Aline Kominsky-Crumb & Robert Crumb. Drawn Together. Anette Gehrig (Hg.). Christoph Merian Verlag, 2016, ISBN 978-3-85616-819-3
- Lorenzo Mattotti. Ligne Fragile. Anette Gehrig (Hg.). Christoph Merian Verlag, 2017, ISBN 978-3-85616-846-9
- Joann Sfar. Ohne Anfang und Ende – Comic in Arbeit. Anette Gehrig (Hg.). Cartoonmuseum Basel, 2019
- Victoria Lomasko. Other Russias. Anette Gehrig (Hg.). Cartoonmuseum Basel, 2019
- Tom Tirabosco. Trente oiseaux morts. Anette Gehrig (Hg.). Cartoonmuseum Basel, 2019
- Christoph Fischer. Während ich schlief. Anette Gehrig (Hg.). Christoph Merian Verlag, 2020, ISBN 978-3-85616-919-0
- Brecht Evens. Idulfania. Cartoonmuseum Basel, Anette Gehrig (Hg.). Christoph Merian Verlag, 2020, ISBN 978-3-85616-937-4

== Directors and curators ==
- 1979–1994 Jürg Spahr
- 1995–2004 Daniel Bolsiger
- 2004–2007 Simone Thalmann, Michael Mauch
- 2008 Anna Bonacci (Januar bis August 2008, ad interim)
- Seit 2008 Anette Gehrig

== See also ==
- Museums in Basel
- Museums-PASS-Musées
- Cartoon Art Museum
- Museum of Comic and Cartoon Art
- The Cartoon Museum
