= Museum of Cultures (Basel) =

Museum in Basel, Switzerland

Coordinates: 47°33′26″N 7°35′27″E

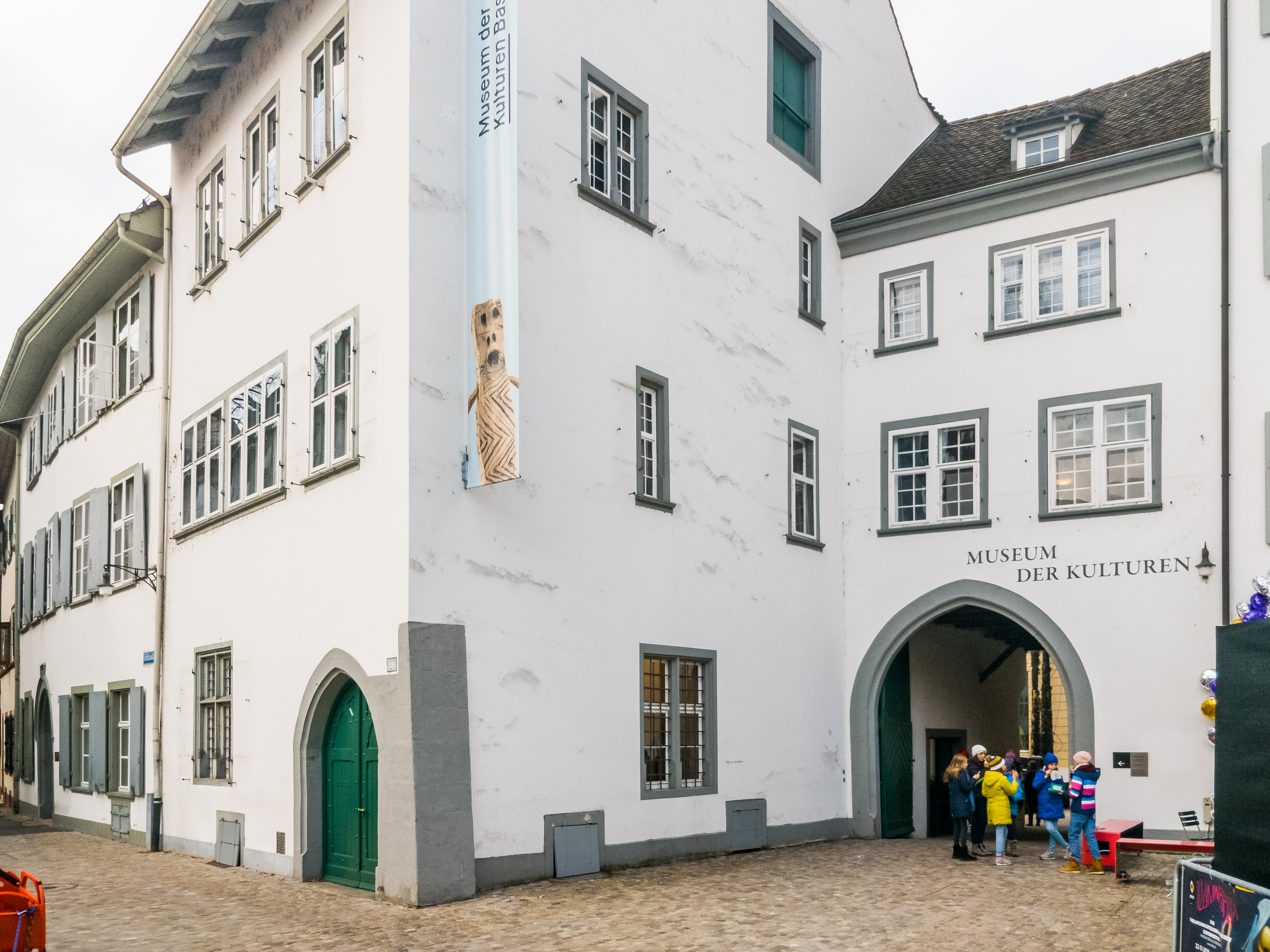
Museum of Cultures Basel

The Museum of Cultures in Basel (German: Museum der Kulturen Basel) is a Swiss museum of ethnography with large and important collections of artifacts, especially from Europe, the South Pacific, Mesoamerica, Tibet, and Bali. It is a Swiss heritage site of national significance.

== History ==
Both the Museum of Cultures and the Natural History Museum Basel trace their origins to the 1840s, when the city of Basel founded its Museum of Natural History and Ethnography to house artifacts and artworks collected by merchants and travelers.

In 1849, the museum moved into a large neoclassical edifice designed by Melchior Berri and located on the Münster hill at the heart of Basel, on the site of a former Augustinian monastery. In 1904 the museum created a separate ethnology department (Abteilung für Völkerkunde), and in 1917 the ethnographic collection became an independent institution inside the same building as the Natural History Museum.

In the early 20th century, the Ethnographic Museum Basel began sponsoring expeditions to enhance its collections. In 1944 the museum was renamed the "Museum of Ethnology and Swiss Museum of Folklore" (Museum für Völkerkunde und Schweizerisches Museum für Volkskunde) to reflect its dual mission of documenting local as well as "foreign" cultures. Over time the museum shifted its focus to the promotion of intercultural dialog, leading to its official renaming in 1996 as the Museum of Cultures.

== Collections and exhibitions ==
In 1844 the museum, still without a permanent home, received hundreds of ancient Mexican ceramics and statues collected by Lukas Vischer of Basel. It remains one of the most notable European collections of ancient American art. Recent exhibitions on Bhutan (1998), Tibet (2001), and Bali (2002) have highlighted the museum's exceptional Asian and Oceanian collections.

With about 300,000 objects and a similar number of historic photographs, the museum is the largest of its kind in Switzerland and one of the biggest in Europe. It also serves the canton of Basel-City by documenting and preserving the local cultural legacy. A 1999 exhibition was devoted to Basel's unique Carnival (Fasnacht) tradition, and the 2005 "Festivals of Light" exhibition explored the city's religious diversity.

The museum's most recent exhibitions have emphasized intercultural comparisons and dialog. The 2007–2008 exhibition "Red: Hot on the Trail of a Color" drew on all of the museum's resources to explore the significance of red in human societies.

== Renovation ==
In 2008, the museum opened a new main entrance on the Münsterplatz, making the museum more accessible and giving it a clearly distinct identity from the Museum of Natural History. The museum plans to further expand its exhibition space. These plans are on hold to allow for a thorough archaeological investigation of the museum courtyard. As of July 2008 investigators had found evidence of late Roman settlement on the site.

== See also ==
- Museums in Basel
- List of museums in Switzerland
