= Petrus Ryff =

Swiss scientist

- Born: 8 May 1552; Basel, Swiss Confederacy
- Died: 19 May 1629 (aged 77); Basel, Swiss Confederacy
- Other names: Petrus Ryffius
- Education: University of Basel (M.D., 1584)
- Scientific career
- Fields: Medicine, mathematics, astronomy
- Institutions: University of Basel
- Thesis: De affectibus cordis (1584)
- Academic advisors: Theodor Zwinger, Thomas Erastus, Felix Plater, Johann Nicolaus Stupanus
- Doctoral students: Emmanuel Stupanus

Petrus Ryff (Swiss Standard German: [riːf]; Latin: Petrus Ryffius; 8 May 1552 – 19 May 1629) was a Swiss mathematician, physician and chronicler.

== Life and work ==
Petrus Ryff was born in Basel, Switzerland. He was the son of Daniel Ryff (1529–1612), and Ursula Zimmermann, and the grandnephew of Basler chronicler Fridolin Ryff.

Petrus Ryff enrolled in the University of his hometown in 1569; he received the B.A. in 1572 and the M.A. in 1576. He continued to study medicine, following the lectures of Theodor Zwinger, Thomas Erastus, Felix Plater, and Johann Nicolaus Stupanus. He was awarded his medical doctorate in 1584.

After that he practiced medicine for a few years, until he succeeded Christian Wursteisen as Professor of Mathematics at the University of Basel in 1586, a position he held until his death in 1629. In 1596 he became a Consultant of the School of Medicine, where he was an active member and 7 times Dean.

He was the author of several books of mathematics, astronomy, and astrology. Among the last is a prognostication for 1594. However, Petrus Ryff is best remembered for continuing and publishing the Basler Chronicles his granduncle Fridolin Ryff maintained between 1514 and 1541. After Fridolin died the chronicles were bequeathed to his daughter Magdalena, who passed them on to Petrus Ryff. He continued the chronicles from 1543 to 1585, and in 1585 he published the chronicles. The Basler Chroniken were edited and re-published in 1872 by the Historische und Antiquarische Gesellschaft zu Basel. They provide an invaluable source of information about the history of Basel, and that part of Europe in the 16th century.

== Selected works ==
- De affectibus cordis, disputatio. Basel: 1584. OCLC 165706088
- De externis corporis vitiis velitatio medica. Basel: 1584
- Historiam Basiliensem, quam patruus ejus Fridolinus Ryff, senator ac scholarcha, a primordiis urbis inceptam & ad sue usque tempora protactum reliquit, ab a. 1514 ad vitae suae terminum continuatit, qua vero hactenus non fuit edita. Basel: 1585.
- Sphaera mundi : hoc est, Elementa cosmographiae, legibus logicis, in usum Acad. Basiliensis, Basel: 1593. OCLC 258505324
- Quaestiones geometricae, in Euclidis et P. Rami - Quibus geodesiam adjecimus per usum radii geometrici, Frankfurt: 1600. OCLC 60916808
- Compendium arithmeticae Vrstisii, Oxford: 1627
- Editio Altera, cui accessit Commentatio Optica, sive brevis Tractatio de Perspectiva Communi, Oxford: 1665
