= Ruth Epting =

Ruth Epting (* June 9, 1919 in Basel; † June 15, 2016 in Basel) was a German-Swiss Protestant churchwoman and women's rights activist.

== Life ==
Her parents were Johanna Epting (née Baumann), daughter to Swiss missionaries from India and her husband Karl Epting, from Southern Germany, a teacher at the Basel Mission . She was the youngest daughter of five. One of her siblings was the romance language scholar Karl Epting. In 1947, she received Swiss residency.

She attended schools in Basel and completed an apprenticeship in home economics; at the same time she visited lectures of the Protestant theologies at the University of Basel.

From 1939 till 1941 she was trained as a community consultant in the Berlin Burckhardthaus and completed a seminar for the ecclesiastical women's service where she met Anna Paulsen. Afterwards she returned to Basel and became youth secretary of the Young Women’s Christian Association.

In 1942, she started her studies of theology at the Confessing Church Centre in Berlin and at the university in Basel under Karl Barth and others. After completing her studies in 1946, she served as a vicar at the St. Markus Church in Basel. In June 1947, after passing her practical exam, she was ordained at the Elisabethenkirche, a Reformed Protestant church. However, she was not licensed to serve as a parson, as this was not possible until 1957. Until 1948, she taught at the Basel Women's Mission and at schools in Basel.

From 1948 to 1953, she worked as a travel secretary. She was sent to New York for six months of training, dedicating herself to rebuilding the CVJF’s women’s and youth programs in Germany. Until 1954, she served as secretary for the women’s and girls’ Bible study groups in Switzerland. She then studied Psychiatry at the University of Basel in 1953–1954 as well as Psychology at the C. G. Jung Institute in Zurich.

Ruth Epting was a curate and one of the first female Swiss pastors in Basel between 1954 and 1974. During this time, she served as a clinical pastor in the psychiatric clinic of the university of Friedmatt in Basel from January 1954 to June 1955, as a vicar in Basel-Oekolampad from 1955 to 1960 and as pastor from 1960 to 1974. In 1971 and 1972 she taught as a lecturer for the New Testament at the Theological College of the Presbyterian Church Cameroon (PCC) in Nyasoso by Tombel in the Département Koupé-Manengouba in Kamerun.

From 1954 to 1959 she held the title of first Swiss-German CVJT National president and from 1961 to 1969 she was one of the first women to be part of the citizen's assembly of Basel and from 1961 to 1980 she worked as a speaker for adult schooling for the Basel Mission. She developed a concept for the house of the Basel Mission, changing it to a centre for meeting for the first and third world from 1974 to 1981.

In 1975 she agreed to the requests of the World Council of Churches by helping make the voices of the women heard, the first event for this being the General Assembly in Nairobi. Later on, she was increasingly involved in the formation of a union between women of all European religious denominations.

She participated in the foundation of the ecumenical forum of the European Christian women of Basel in 1978 and in 1982 she became citizen of Gwatt and their honorary president in 1986. In that same year she became the head of the first women's consultation of Brussels.

She retired in 1981 and in her honor, the University of Basel appointed her as Dr. theol. h. c. for her effort for the ecclesiastical women's work, for ecumenical Christianity and missionary work.

At her time, the celibacy applied to all pastors in Switzerland, which is why she stayed unmarried all her life.

== Texts (selection) ==
- Einsames oder gemeinsames Leben? Ein paar Gedanken zum Leben der Frau heute. Basel: Verlag der Schweizer Frauen- und Mädchen-Bibelkreise; Brunnen-Verlag 1958.
- Für die Freiheit frei – Der Weg der Frau in Kirche und Gesellschaft. Zürich: Theologischer Verlag 1972.
- Das Erbe des Missionars. Basel: Selbstverlag 1979.
- Eine Vision wird Wirklichkeit: das Ökumenische Forum Christlicher Frauen in Europa von den Anfängen bis 1990. 1994

== Literature ==
- Elisabeth C. Miescher: Netze der Versöhnung knüpfen – Widerstandserfahrungen und neue theologische Einsichten von christlichen Frauen in verschiedenen Kontexten; zum 80. Geburtstag von Ruth Epting, einer Frau des Widerstands und der Versöhnung. Basel: Basileia-Verlag 1999.
- Peter Aerne: "Ich kann mich nur freuen, wenn Theologinnen zum Pfarramte zugelassen werden." : der beschwerliche Weg von der Pfarrhelferin zum vollen Pfarramt für Frauen in der reformierten Kirche Basel-Stadt (1914–1976). In: Basler Zeitschrift für Geschichte und Altertumskunde, Bd. 105, 2005, doi:10.5169/seals-118496#200, S. 197–233.
- Meehyun Chung mit Elisabeth Miescher: Weaving dreams: Festschrift zum 90. Geburtstag von Pfarrerin Dr. theol. h.c. Ruth Epting. Berlin: Frank & Timme 2009, ISBN 978-3-86596-198-3.
- Luzius Müller (Hgt.): Im Geiste der Reformation – Porträts aus Basel 1517–2017. Zürich: TVZ 2017, S. 84 f.
- Brigitta Stoll: "Ruth Epting" in German, French and Italian in the online Historical Dictionary of Switzerland, 2017-09-27.
- Evelyne Zinsstag: Ganz Frau – ganz Mensch. Marga Bührig, Else Kähler, Ruth Epting und das Frauenzölibat der 1950er Jahre. Masterarbeit, Zürich 2017.
