= Zingg =

Zingg is a surname. Notable people with the surname include:

- Adrian Zingg (1734–1816), Swiss painter
- David Drew Zingg (1923–2000), American photographer and journalist
- Drew Zingg (1957–2025), American guitarist
- Hans Zingg, Canadian professor
- Jules-Émile Zingg (1882–1942), French painter
- Monika Zingg (born 1943), Swiss figure skater
- Silvan Zingg (born 1973), Swiss jazz pianist
- Willy Zingg (died 1968), Swiss footballer
