= Paul Herrling =

Paul Herrling is the head of corporate research at Novartis and the chairman of board of the Novartis Institute for Tropical Diseases, Singapore since 2002. Prior to this, he was the head of Global Research of Novartis Pharma.

Paul Herrling is also Professor of Drug Discovery Science at the University of Basel, Switzerland and Full Adjunct Professor at the Harold Dorris Neurobiological Institute, Scripps Research Institute, La Jolla, California.

He obtained his Ph.D. in 1975 at the University of Zurich and was a post-doctorate fellow at the UCLA Neuropsychiatric Institute.
