= Nikolaus Eglinger =

Swiss physician

- Born: 1645
- Died: 1711 (aged 65–66)
- Education: University of Basel (M.D., 1661)
- Scientific career
- Fields: Medicine
- Workplaces: University of Basel
- Thesis: Disputatio medica in universam physiologiam; Disputatio Medica Inauguralis De Angina (1661)
- Doctoral advisor: Emmanuel Stupanus; Johann Bauhin
- Doctoral students: Johann Bernoulli

Nikolaus Eglinger (Swiss Standard German: [ˈeːɡlɪŋər]; 1645–1711) was a Swiss medical doctor, based in Basel.

== Origin ==
Nikolaus Eglinger's parents were Hans Heinrich Eglinger (1610–1682) and Anna Herzog (1616–1689). His father, Hans Heinrich Eglinger, initially worked as a salt merchant in Basel. In 1646, he was appointed imperial notary by Count Palatine Johann Jacob Grasser the Younger. From 1648, he was a member of the Grand Council in Basel.

Nikolaus Eglinger's maternal grandmother was Veronica Ryhiner (1583–1650), who was married to Johann Rudolf Herzog (1585–1629). A great-uncle of Nikolaus Eglinger was Johann Friedrich Ryhiner (1574–1634), who became mayor of Basel in 1630 and was one of the four wealthiest citizens of Basel at the time.

His paternal grandparents were Werner Eglinger (J. U. L. Margrave of Baden-Durlach Privy Councillor and Chief Magistrate of Badenweiler), who was married to Sara Brand. She was the daughter of Bernhard Brand (Bailiff of Homburg in 1553, Councillor from 1559, ennobled by Emperor Ferdinand I in 1563 and purchase of Wildenstein Castle, Chief Guild Master from 1570 to 1577 and from 1591 to 1594, Bailiff of Farnsburg in 1577).

== Career and work ==
Nikolaus Eglinger studied at the University of Basel under Emmanuel Stupanus and Johann Caspar Bauhin. After receiving his doctorate in medicine in 1661, Nikolaus Eglinger embarked on an educational journey to France, England, and Holland, spending an extended period in Leiden with François de le Boë Sylvius, who is considered the founder of scientifically oriented medicine and clinical chemistry. From 1675 he was a physician at the University of Basel, and from 1685 he taught anatomy, theoretical, and practical medicine. He served three terms as rector of the University of Basel (1687, 1699, and 1707).

In 1690, Johann Bernoulli produced his dissertation under the supervision of Eglinger.
