= Jean Bauhin =

French physician

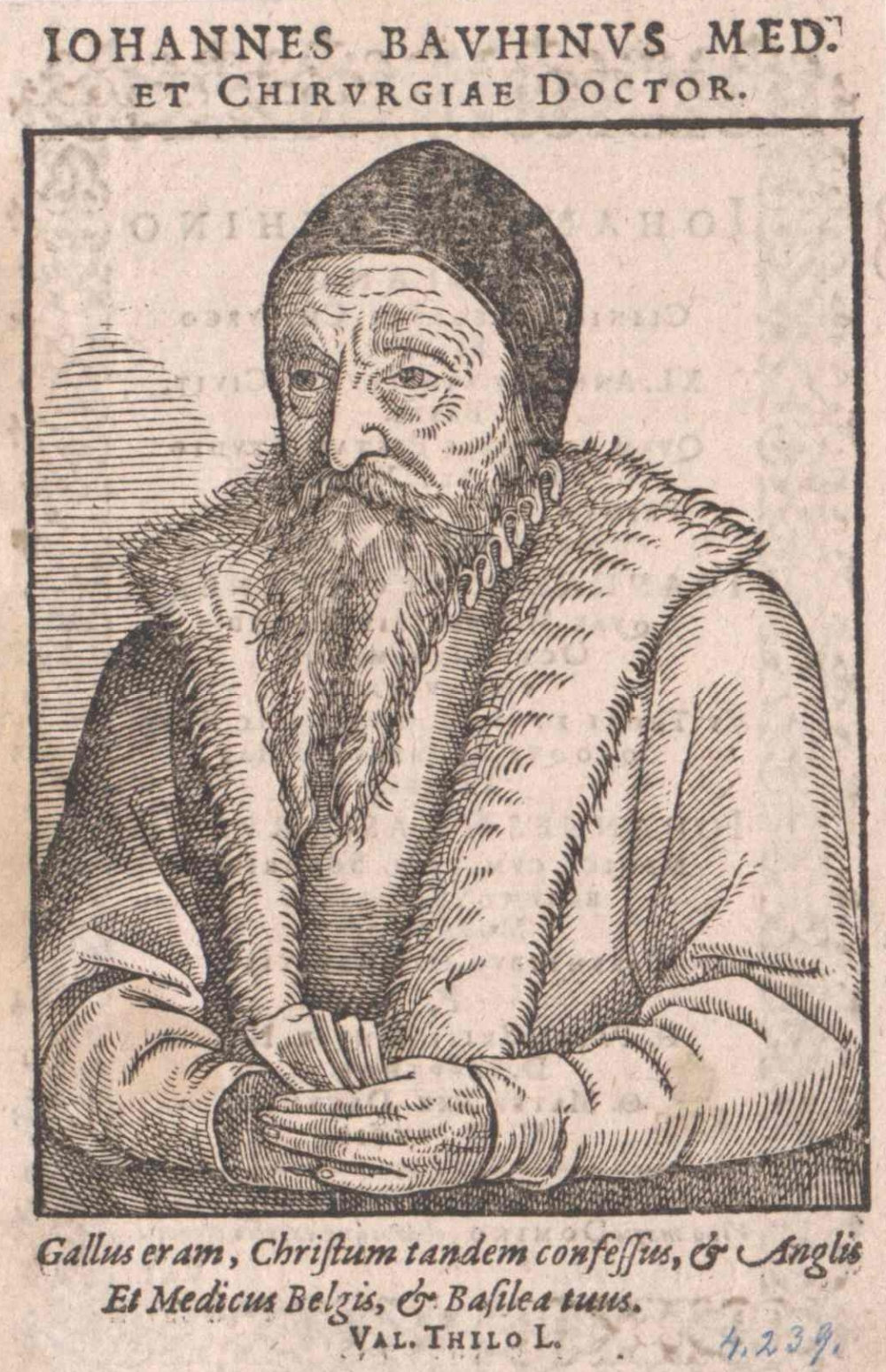
- Portrait of Jean Bauhin.
- Born: 24 August 1511; Amiens, France
- Died: 23 January 1582 (aged 70); Basel, Switzerland
- Scientific career
- Fields: Medicine

Jean Bauhin (24 August 1511 – 23 January 1582) was a French surgeon. He was born in Amiens, France and died in Basel, Switzerland, where he had to relocate after converting to Protestantism.

He was the physician to Jeanne d'Albret, Queen of Navarre.

He had two sons who became physicians and notable botanists: Johann Bauhin (also known as Jean Bauhin, 1541–1613) and Gaspard Bauhin (Caspar Bauhin, 1560–1624).
