= Emmanuel Stupanus =

17th-century Swiss physician

- Born: Emmanuel Stuppan; 13 December 1587; Basel, Switzerland
- Died: 26 February 1664 (aged 76); Basel, Switzerland
- Education: University of Geneva; University of Basel (M.D., 1613)
- Scientific career
- Fields: Medicine
- Institutions: University of Basel
- Thesis: De omnis pleuritidis theoria et generali therapia themata medica (1613)
- Doctoral advisor: Petrus Ryff
- Other academic advisors: Johann Nicolaus Stupanus; Felix Plater
- Doctoral students: Georg Balthasar Metzger; Franciscus Sylvius; Johann Bauhin; Nikolaus Eglinger

Emmanuel Stupanus (/stjuːˈpeɪnəs/; born Emmanuel Stuppan, German: [ˈʃtʊpan]; December 13, 1587 – February 26, 1664) was a Swiss physician and professor in Basel.

== Life and work ==
Emmanuel Stupanus was born in Basel, Switzerland. He was the son of Johann Nicolaus Stupanus (1542–1621), Professor of Theoretical Medicine at the University of Basel, and his second wife, Katharina Iselin. He was married to Judith Zörnlin; one of his granddaughters, Judith Stupanus, was to become the wife of Jacob Bernoulli.

Stupanus completed his Gymnasium education in 1603. The next year he was sent to the University of Geneva, where he studied philosophy under Esaïe Colladon and Gaspard Laurent. In 1607 he returned to Basel, having first privately defended the Baccalaureus and later publicly the A.L.M. degree. He continued to study medicine, following the lectures of his father, and Gaspard Bauhin and Felix Plater. After visiting well-known Universities in Germany, France and Italy he was awarded the degree of Medical Doctor from Basel under Petrus Ryff, in 1613. He also took classes in Ancient Greek from Jacob Zwinger, philosophy from Heinrich Justus, and rhetoric from Friedrich Castellio.

From 1614, Stupanus he served privately as a substitute for his father, and after 1617 in an official position. He succeeded his father in the Chair of Theoretical Medicine, in 1620. On March 28, 1620, he delivered his Inaugural Lecture De fraudibus Paracelsistarum, in which he expressed his opinion about Paracelsus. He held this position until his death in 1664, and during this time he served twelve times as Dean of the Medical School, and three times as President of the University. Between the two them, Emmanuel Stupanus and his father occupied the Chair of Theoretical Medicine for a total of 72 years.

Emmanuel Stupanus was the doctoral thesis advisor for several students, among them Franciscus Sylvius in 1637.

Stupanus died on February 26, 1664, in Basel.

== Selected works ==
- Themata medica de omnis pleuritidis theoria & generali therapia, Basel 1613 which has been his Inaugural-Disputation
- Vere aureorum aphorismorum Hippocratis enarrationes & commentaria aphoristica , Basel 1615. OCLC 56035016
- Institutionum medicinæ, sev medendi methodi, ad Hippocrat[is], Galeni aliorumque veterum et recentiorum medicorum celeberrimorum scripta, adytum & expeditissimum iter parantes, a Leonharto Fuchsio, Basel 1618. OCLC 185469695
- Praecipua Pseudochymias Capita, ex Theophrasti Paracelsi quisquiliis, Basel 1621. OCLC 249745505
- Oratio de vita et obitu Casp. Bauhini, Basel 1625. OCLC 249745294
- Animae humanae essentia, praceipuae hujus facultates, et functiones, cum-primis animales, illarum sedes, et agendi instrumenta, Basel 1627. OCLC 249746004
- Lexicon medicum Graeco-Latinum, compendiosiss. a Bartolomeo Castelli inchoatum, Basel 1628. OCLC 14317088
- Johannis Riolani senioris, Regii quondam medici Parisiens. celeberrimi, artis medicinalis, theoricae & practicae sejunctim hactenus multoties excusae, systema, Basel 1629. OCLC 43128714
