= Johann Nikolaus Stupanus =

Italian-Swiss physician

- Born: Johann Nikolaus Stuppa; 1542; Pontresina
- Died: 1621 (aged 78–79); Basel
- Scientific career
- Fields: Medicine
- Workplaces: University of Basel
- Notable students: Emmanuel Stupanus

Johann Nikolaus Stupanus (/stjuːˈpeɪnəs/; born Johann Nikolaus Stuppa; 1542–1621) was an Italian-Swiss physician, known also as a translator. He was the father of Emmanuel Stupanus (1587–1664).

== Life ==
He was originally from Pontresina, and joined the faculty of medicine at the University of Basel. He taught theoretical medicine there from 1589 to 1620 and developed a systematic medical semiology.

== Work ==
Stupanus wrote an introduction to the second edition (1581) of The Prince by Niccolò Machiavelli: it was a Latin translation by Silvestro Tegli and published at Basel by Pietro Perna, both Italian Protestants in exile and followers of Caelius Secundus Curio (whose panegyric oration Stupanus had given at Basel in 1570). Stupanus committed a provocation by dedicating the work to the Catholic bishop Jakob Christoph Blarer von Wartensee, and for a time was deprived of his teaching post. In 1588 a Latin translation of Machiavelli's Discourses on Livy by Stupanus himself was published.
