= Novartis Institute for Tropical Diseases =

Singapore-based research institute

Coordinates: 1.3040°N 103.7891°E

The Novartis Institute for Tropical Disease (NITD) was a Singapore-based tropical disease research institute created through a public-private partnership between Novartis and the Singapore Economic Development Board. Research at NITD focuses primarily on developing novel small molecule therapies for tropical infectious diseases that are endemic to the developing world, particularly dengue fever, malaria and tuberculosis.

== History and mission ==
NITD was founded in 2002 as a public-private partnership between Swiss-based pharmaceutical company Novartis and the Singapore Economic Development Board.

NITD states its goals are "to discover novel treatments and prevention methods for major tropical diseases." Their website states they hope to have at least two drug candidates going through clinical trials in patients by the year 2012.

Novartis has also stated that the NITD will seek to make treatments developed by the NITD available without profit to the poor in developing nations in which these diseases are endemic.

In 2017, NITD moved out of Singapore to be beside Novartis' infectious diseases research headquarters in Emeryville, California, United States.

== Research ==
NITD is a small molecule drug discovery research institute.

Research is currently focused on three main diseases:

- dengue fever
- malaria
- tuberculosis.

NITD's research model relies on global partnership with other research institutes. In 2008, NITD announced a 5-year collaborative research effort would be conducted in cooperation with the TB Alliance to develop new medicines for tuberculosis, including drug resistant tuberculosis.

== Education ==
In addition to research, NITD is engaged in educational activities. It runs a research-based Master of Science program in fields related to infectious diseases in cooperation with National University of Singapore, University of Basel and Swiss Tropical Institute.

NITD also supports training opportunities for post-graduate students and post-doctoral fellows.
