= Gaspard Bauhin =

Swiss botanist (1560–1624)

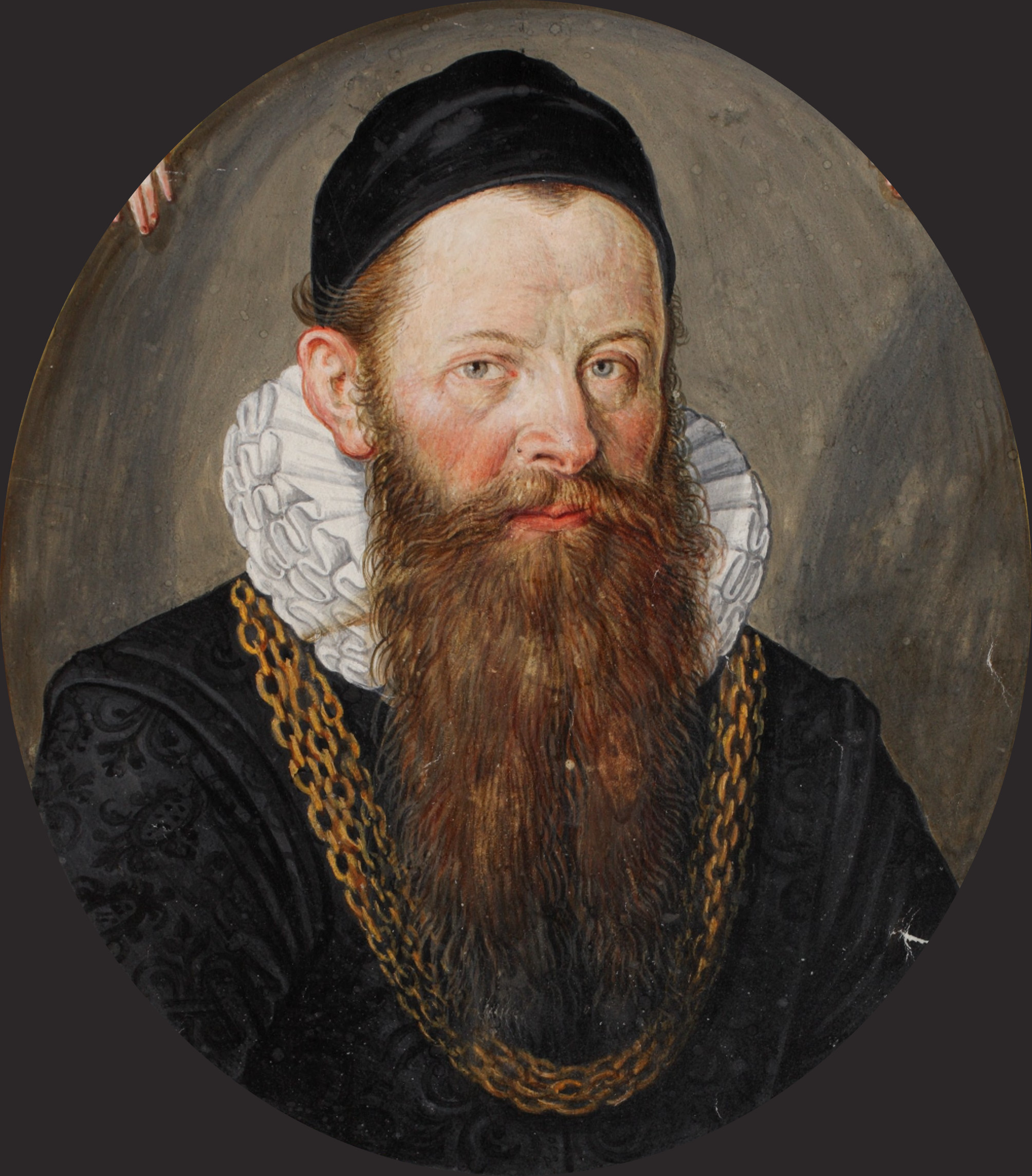
- Born: 17 January 1560; Basel, Switzerland
- Died: 5 December 1624 (aged 64); Basel, Switzerland
- Other names: Caspar Bauhin; Casparus Bauhinus
- Education: University of Basel (M.D., 1581)
- Known for: Pinax theatri botanici
- Scientific career
- Fields: Botany
- Notable students: Emmanuel Stupanus
- Author abbrev. (botany): C.Bauhin

Gaspard Bauhin or Caspar Bauhin (Latin: Casparus Bauhinus; 17 January 1560 – 5 December 1624), was a Swiss botanist whose Pinax theatri botanici (1623) described thousands of plants and classified them in a manner that draws comparisons to the later binomial nomenclature of Linnaeus. He was a disciple of the famous Italian physician Girolamo Mercuriale and he also worked on human anatomical nomenclature.

Bauhin described the ileocecal valve in 1588—hence the name Bauhin's Valve or Valve of Bauhin—in the preface of his first writing, De corporis humani partibus externis tractatus, hactenus non editus. Linnaeus honored the Bauhin brothers Gaspard and Jean in the genus name Bauhinia.

== Biography ==
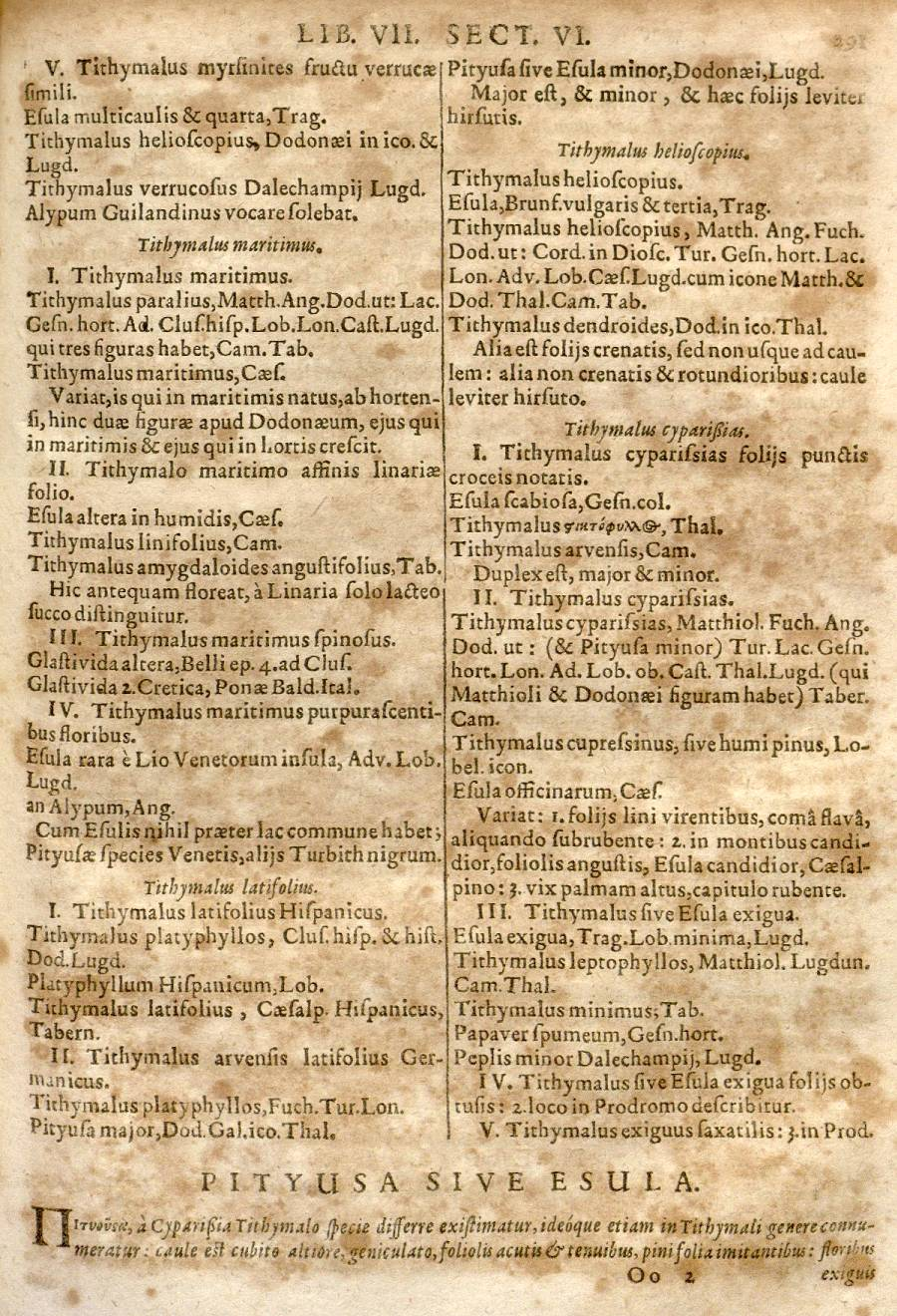
Caspar Bauhin (1623), Pinax Theatri Botanici, page 291. On this page, a number of Tithymalus species (now Euphorbia) is listed, described and provided with synonyms and references. Bauhin already used binomial names but did not consistently give all species throughout the work binomials.

Jean and Gaspard were the sons of Jean Bauhin (1511–1582), a French surgeon to the King who had to leave his native country on becoming a convert to Protestantism. Gaspard was born in Basel. From 1572 he studied in his hometown, Padua, Bologna, Montpellier, Paris and Tübingen. He was awarded his medical doctorate at the University of Basel in 1581 and started giving private lectures in botany and anatomy. In 1582 he was appointed to the Greek professorship at the same university, as well as in 1589 to the new established chair of anatomy and botany. After the death of Felix Platter in 1614, Bauhin was made professor of the practice of medicine and city physician (Stadtarzt). He was rector of the University of Basel in 1592, then again in 1611 and 1619; during the second rectorate the university tried in vain to win back from the city council the freedoms of 1460, which were lost in 1532.

As a impressive example of how independent scientific disciplines as botany were established at early modern universities, Bauhin systematically trained a whole generation of scholars to become qualified botanists, while the University of Basel became the undisputed center of the science in the German-speaking world around 1600. With regard to empirical research, Bauhin’s herbarium was with more than 4,000 species one of the most extensive of its time. Its scientific layout and design corresponded to Bauhin's plan of a 'general history' (or catalogue) of all existing plants. To further his career, young Bauhin built up a large network of correspondents. These connections also allowed him to collect foreign and exotic botanical samples. With more than 2,500 letters preserved, his correspondence is a larger source corpus than even that of famous contemporary botanist Carolus Clusius.

Following the Phytopinax (Basel, 1596), Bauhin’s earliest botanical publication, the Pinax theatri botanici (Basel, 1623, English: Illustrated exposition of plants) was a landmark of botanical history, describing some 6,000 species and classifying them. The classification system was not particularly innovative, using traditional groups such as "trees", "shrubs", and "herbs", and using other characteristics such as utilization, for instance grouping spices into the Aromata. He did ‘correctly’, by the standards of modern botany, group grasses, legumes, and several others. His most important contribution is in the description of genera and species. He introduced many names of genera that were later adopted by Linnaeus, and remain in use. For species he carefully pruned the descriptions down to as few words as possible; in many cases a single word sufficed as description, thus giving the appearance of a two-part name. However, the single-word description was still a description intended to be diagnostic, not an arbitrarily-chosen name (in the Linnaean system, many species names honor individuals, for instance).

In addition to Pinax Theatri Botanici, Gaspard planned another work, a Theatrum Botanicum, meant to be comprised in twelve parts folio, of which he finished three; only one, however, was published (1658), long after his death. He also gave a copious catalogue of the plants growing in the environs of Basel, its flora, and edited the works of Pietro Andrea Mattioli (1500–1577) with considerable additions. His principal work on anatomy was Theatrum Anatomicum infinitis locis auctum (1592).

== Works ==
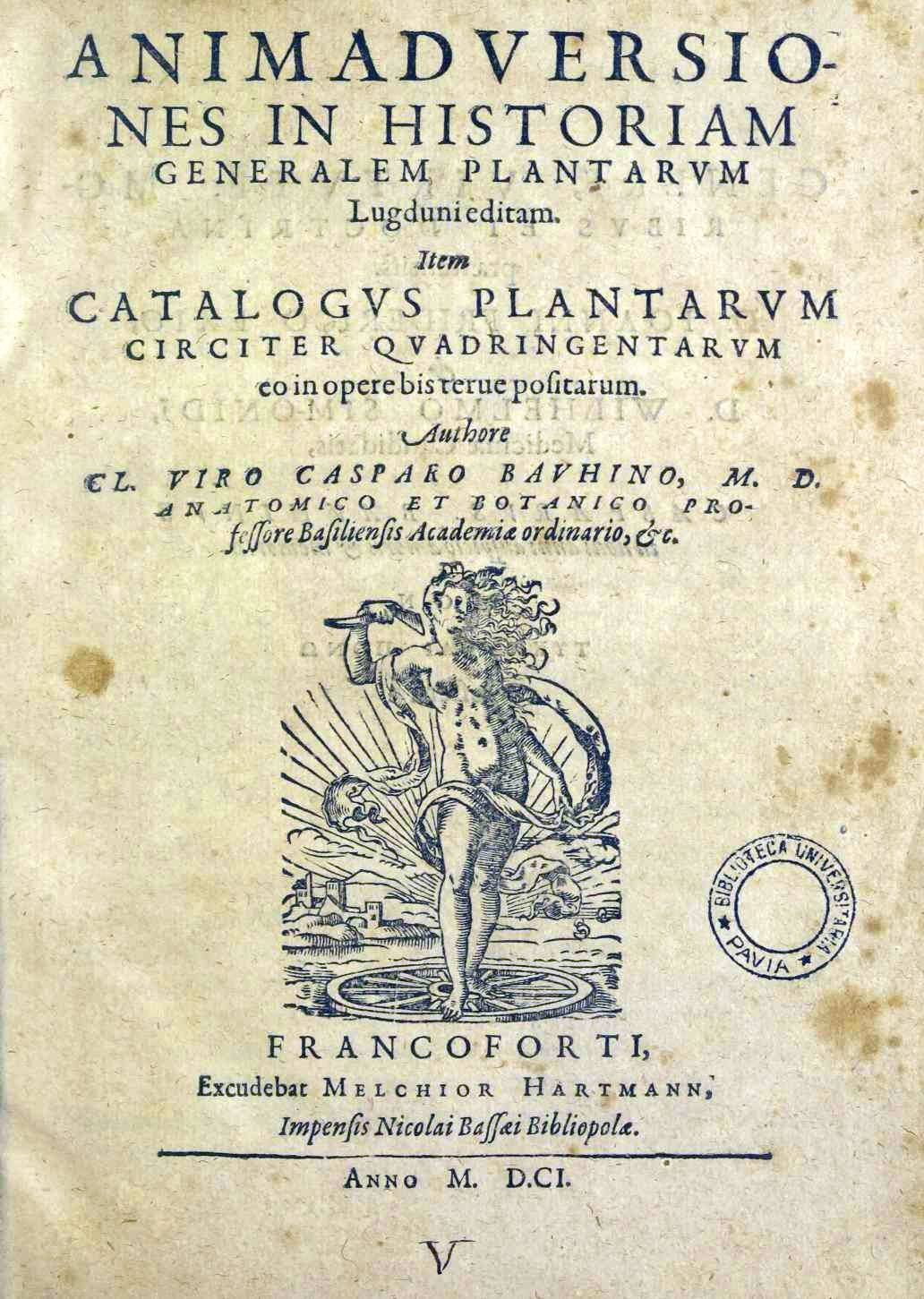
Animadversiones in historiam generalem plantarum, 1601

- (as editor), Petri Andreae Matthioli Opera Omnia, Johannes König, Basel, 1574.
- Theatrum anatomicum infinitis locis auctum, ad morbos accommodatum, Basel, 1592.
  - Theatrum Anatomicum, Frankfurt am Main, 1605.
- Phytopinax seu enumeratio plantarum (in Latin). Basel. 1596 – via Sebastian Henricpetri.
- Anatomica corporis virilis et muliebris historia, Leiden, 1597.
- Animadversiones in historiam generalem plantarum (in Latin). Frankfurt am Main. 1601 – via Melchior Hartmann.
- Prodromos theatri botanici (in Latin). 1620. The introduction to his projected magnum opus.
  - Prodromos theatri botanici (in Latin). Basel. 1671 – via Johann König.
- Pinax theatri botanici, Basel, 1623.
  - Pinax theatri botanici (in Latin). Basel. 1671 – via Johann König.
- Vivae imagines partium corporis humani (in Latin). Frankfurt am Main. 1640 – via Matthäus Merian (I).
- Theatrum Botanicum, 1658.
- Histoire des plantes de l'Europe, et des plus usitées qui viennent d'Asie, d'Afrique, & de l'Amérique […], 2 voll., Lyon, 1671.

== See also ==
- Herman Boerhaave
- Joseph Pitton de Tournefort
- Ileocecal valve
