= Johann Bauhin =

Swiss botanist (1541–1613)

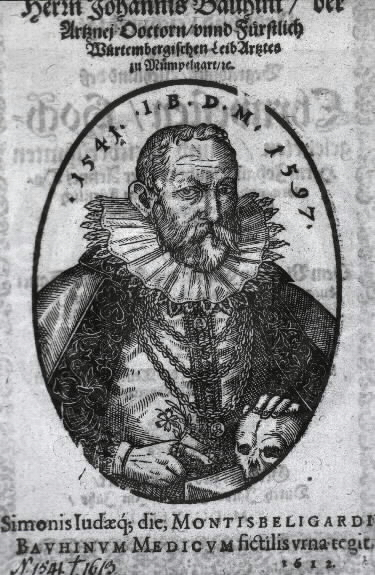
- Born: 12 December 1541; Old Swiss Confederacy
- Died: 26 October 1613 (aged 71); Montbéliard, Kingdom of France
- Education: University of Basel (M.D., 1649)
- Known for: Historia plantarum universalis
- Father: Jean Bauhin
- Relatives: Gaspard Bauhin (brother)
- Scientific career
- Fields: Botany
- Workplaces: University of Basel
- Thesis: Signorum medicorum doctrina annexa sphygmice, uromantia et crisium theoria, ex praecipuis Galen. et Hippocr. monumentis semeioticis excerpta (1649)
- Doctoral advisor: Emmanuel Stupanus
- Other academic advisors: Leonhart Fuchs
- Doctoral students: Nikolaus Eglinger

Johann (or Jean) Bauhin (12 December 1541 – 26 October 1613) was a Swiss botanist, born in Basel. He was the son of physician Jean Bauhin and the brother of physician and botanist Gaspard Bauhin.

== Biography ==
Bauhin studied botany at the University of Tübingen under Leonhart Fuchs (1501–1566). He then travelled with Conrad Gessner, after which he started a practice of medicine at Basel, where he was elected Professor of Rhetoric in 1566. Four years later he was invited to become the physician to Frederick I, Duke of Württemberg at Montbéliard, in the Franche-Comté where he remained until his death. He devoted himself chiefly to botany. His great work, Historia plantarum universalis, a compilation of all that was then known about botany, remained incomplete at his death, but was published at Yverdon in 1650–1651.

Bauhin nurtured several botanic gardens and also collected plants during his travels. In 1591, he published a list of plants named after saints called De plantis a divis sanctisve nomen habentibus.

Johann Bauhin died in Montbéliard.

Carl Linnaeus named the genus Bauhinia (family Caesalpiniaceae) for the brothers Johann and Gaspard Bauhin.

== Works ==
- De plantis a divis sanctisve nomen habentibus, apud Conrad. Waldkirch, 1591.
- Bauhin, Johann (1598). Historia novi et admirabilis fontis balneique Bollensis in ducatu Wirtembergico ad acidulas Goepingenses (in Latin). Montbéliard – via Jacques Foillet.
- Bauhin, Johann; Cherler, Johann Heinrich (1650). Historia plantarvm vniuersalis, nova, et absolvtissima: cvm consensv et dissensv circa eas. 3 vols (in Latin). Vol. 1. Yverdon.(available here at Biodiversity Library)
  - Historia plantarum universalis (in Latin). Vol. 2. Yverdon. 1651.
  - Historia plantarum universalis (in Latin). Vol. 3. Yverdon. 1651.
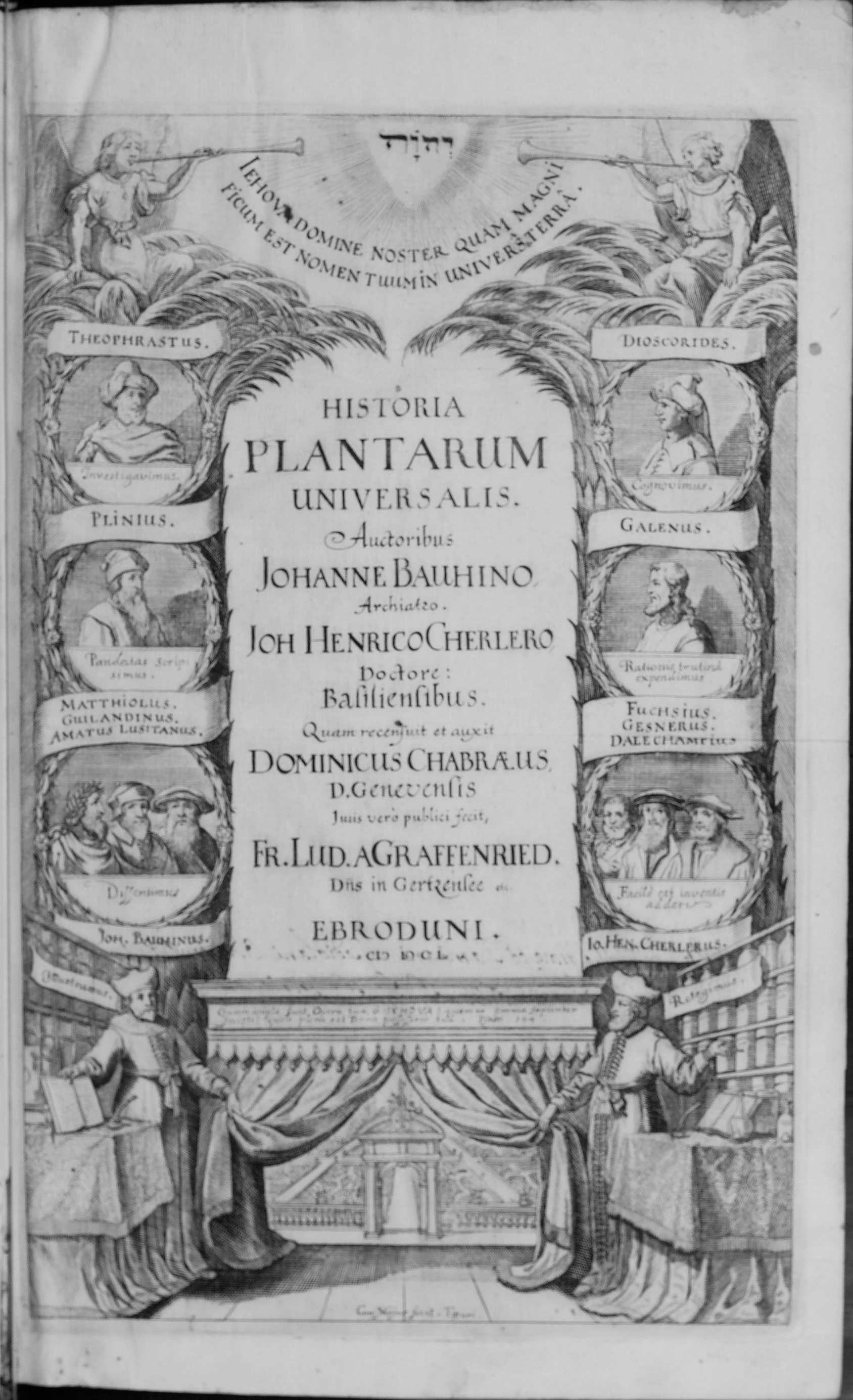
Historia plantarum universalis, 1650
