= Franciscus Sylvius =

Dutch physician, chemist, and anatomist (1614-72)

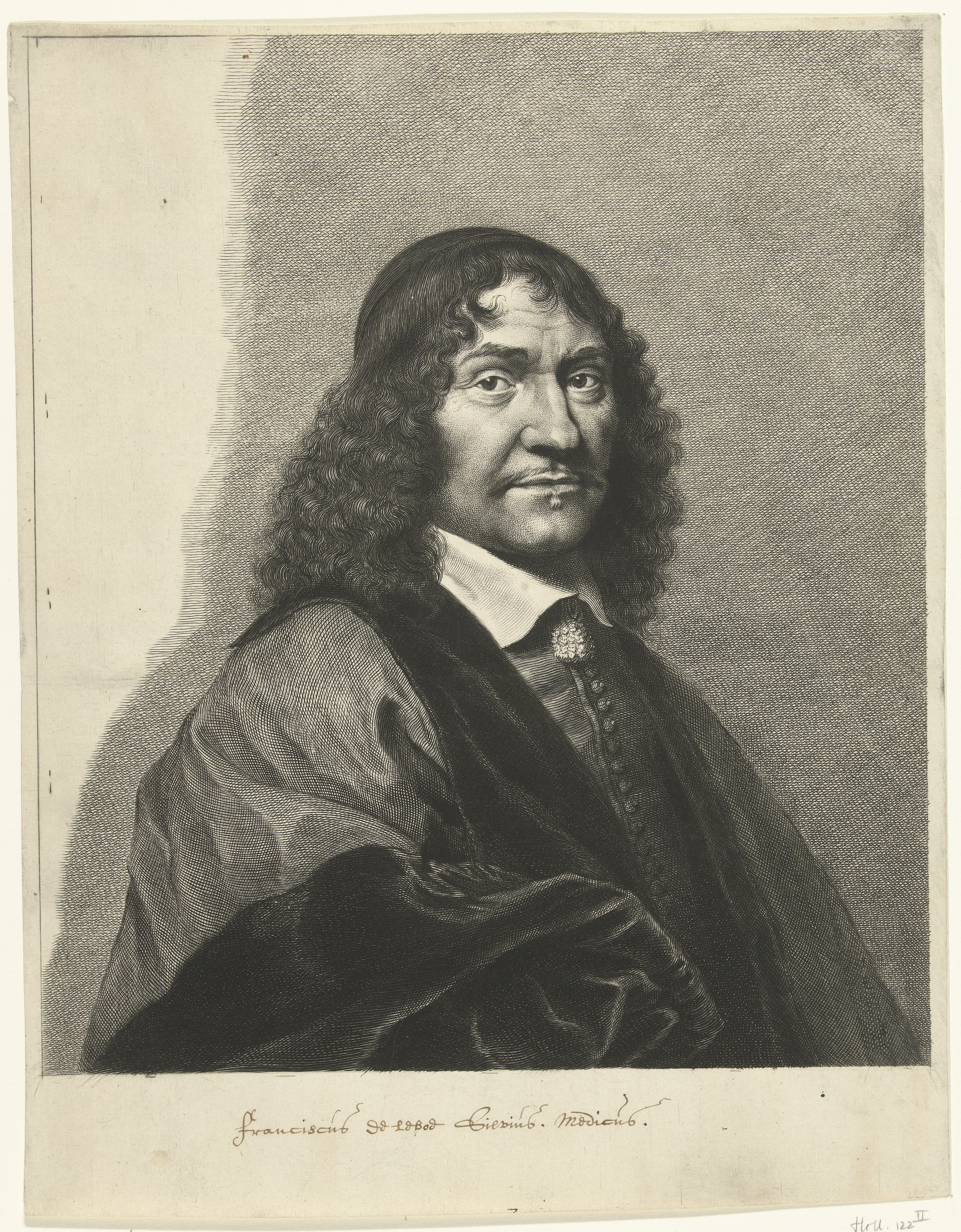
- Franciscus Sylvius
- Born: Franz de le Boë; 15 March 1614; Hanau, Holy Roman Empire
- Died: 19 November 1672 (aged 58); Leiden, Republic of the United Netherlands
- Education: Academy of Sedan; Leiden University; University of Basel (M.D., 1637)
- Known for: Sylvian fissure Aqueduct of Sylvius
- Scientific career
- Institutions: Leiden University
- Theses: Positiones variae medicae (Various Medical Positions) (1634); De animali motu ejusque laesionibus (On Animal Movement and its Disorders) (1637)
- Doctoral advisor: Emmanuel Stupanus
- Other academic advisors: Adolph Vorstius; Otto Heurnius
- Doctoral students: Burchard de Volder
- Other notable students: Ehrenfried von Tschirnhaus

Franciscus Sylvius (Dutch: [frɑnˈsɪskʏs ˈsɪlvijʏs], Ecclesiastical Latin: [franˈtʃiskus ˈsilvi.us]; born Franz de le Boë;Dutch pronunciation: [frɑns də lə bo.ə] 15 March 1614 – 19 November 1672) was a Dutch physician and scientist (chemist, physiologist and anatomist) who was an early champion of Descartes', Van Helmont's and William Harvey's work and theories. He was one of the earliest defenders of the theory of circulation of the blood in the Netherlands, and commonly falsely cited as the inventor of gin – others pinpoint the origin of gin to Italy.

== Life ==
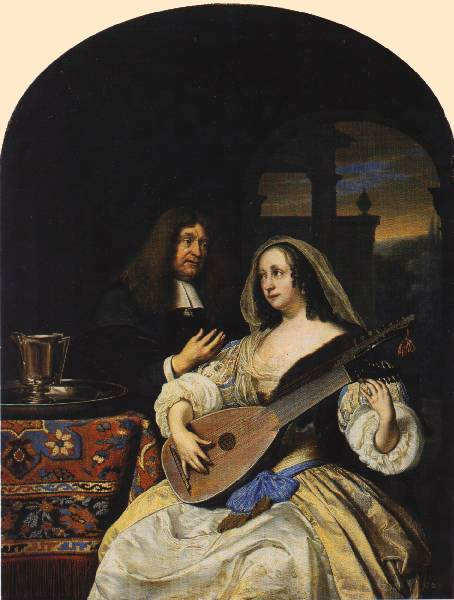
Franciscus Sylvius and his wife by Frans van Mieris, Sr.

Sylvius, a Latinization of "de le Boë" translated as "of the woods", was born in Hanau to an affluent family originally from Cambrai, but worked and died in the Netherlands.

He studied medicine at the Protestant Academy of Sedan, and from 1632 to 1634 at Leiden University under Adolph Vorstius and Otto Heurnius. In 1634 he held a dissertation titled Positiones variae medicae (Various Medical Positions) under the direction of Vorstius, in which he defended the proposition that there should be a pulmonary circulation. After that Sylvius made a study tour to Jena and Wittenberg.

On 16 March 1637 he defended a doctoral thesis titled De animali motu ejusque laesionibus (On Animal Movement and its Disorders) at the University of Basel under the direction of Emmanuel Stupanus. After practicing medicine in his hometown Hanau he returned to Leiden in 1639 to lecture. In this period he became famous for his demonstrations on circulation. From 1641 on he had a lucrative medical practice in Amsterdam. While in Amsterdam he met Glauber, who introduced him to chemistry. In 1658 he was appointed the professor of medicine at Leiden University and was paid 1800 guilders which was twice the usual salary. He was the university's Vice-Chancellor in 1669–70.

== Work ==
In 1669 Sylvius founded the first academic chemical laboratory. For this reason, the building in which the Institute of Biology of Leiden University is housed has the name Sylvius Laboratory. His most famous students were Jan Swammerdam, Reinier de Graaf, Niels Stensen and Burchard de Volder.

He founded the Iatrochemical School of Medicine, according to which all life and disease processes are based on chemical actions. That school of thought attempted to understand medicine in terms of universal rules of physics and chemistry. Sylvius also introduced the concept of chemical affinity as a way to understand the way the human body uses salts and contributed greatly to the understanding of digestion and of bodily fluids. The most important work he published was Praxeos medicae idea nova (New Idea in Medical Practice, 1671). Specifically, he explained that digestion is a result of the chemical reactions of acids and bases coming from pancreatic, stomach, and saliva secretions.

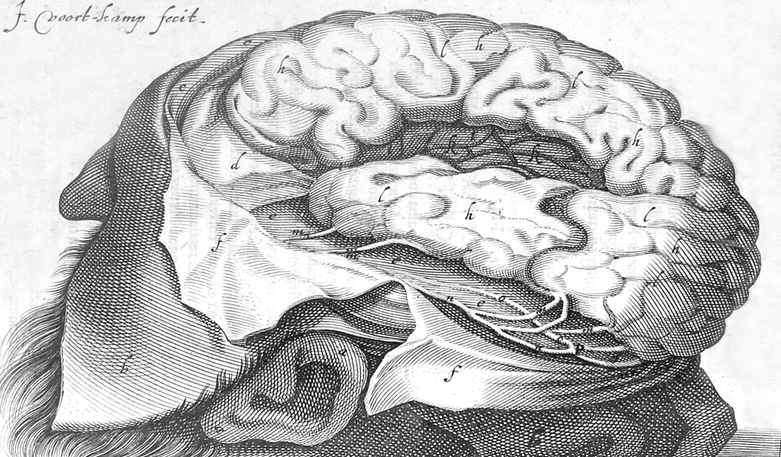
The engraving by J. Voort Kamp published in 1641 that led to the lateral sulcus being named after Franciscus Sylvius

He researched the structure of the brain and was credited as the discoverer of the cleft in the brain known as Sylvian fissure by Caspar Bartholin in his 1641 book Casp. Bartolini Institutiones Anatomicae In this book, it is noted that in the preface that "We can all measure the nobility of Sylvius’s brain and talent by the marvelous, new structure of the brain". And also, "In the new images of the brain, the engraver followed the design and scalpel of the most thorough Franciscus Sylvius, to whom we owe, in this part, everything that the brain has the most, or the most wonderful of".

However Caspar Bartholin died in 1629 and Franciscus Sylvius only started medicine in 1632 and it has been argued that the words in this word describing the Sylvian fissure are either by his son Thomas Bartholin or indeed Franciscus Sylvius. In 1663 in his Disputationem Medicarum, Franciscus Sylvius under his own name described the lateral fissure: "Particularly noticeable is the deep fissure or hiatus which begins at the roots of the eyes (oculorum radices) [...] it runs posteriorly above the temples as far as the roots of the brain stem (medulla radices). [...] It divides the cerebrum into an upper, larger part and a lower, smaller part".

The Sylvian fissure and the Sylvian aqueduct are named after him.

The mineral sylvite was also named for Sylvius.

His book Opera Medica, published posthumously in 1679, recognizes scrofula and phthisis as forms of tuberculosis.

He owned a collection of 190 paintings, nine by Frans van Mieris and eleven by Gerard Dou, in the 17th century highly valued and pricey painters.
