= Meehyun Chung =

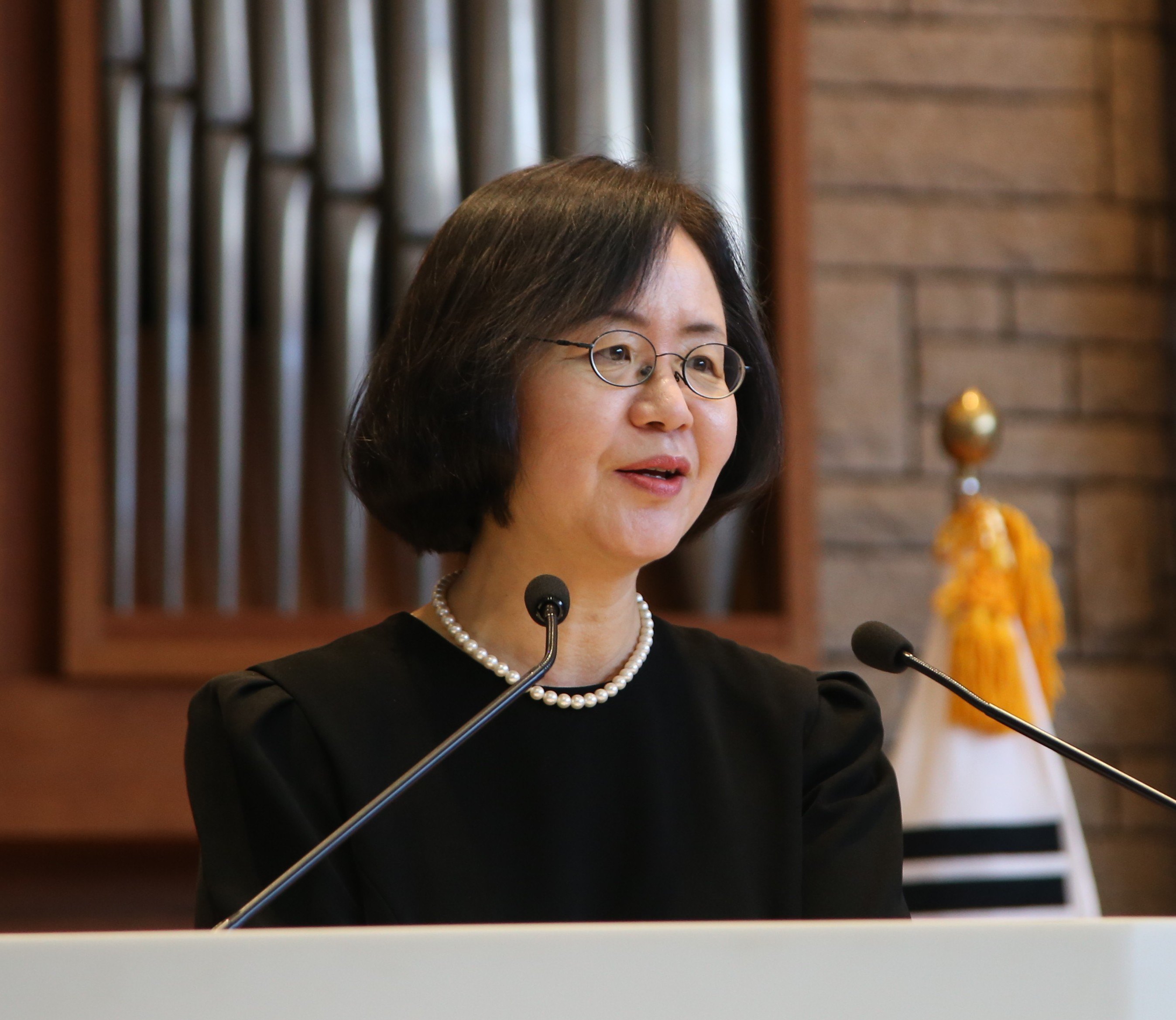
- Professor Meehyun Chung in September 2018
- Education: Basel University
- Occupations: Professor, Yonsei University
- Known for: Karl Barth, Systematic theology

Korean name
- Hangul: 정미현
- RR: Jeong Mihyeon
- MR: Chŏng Mihyŏn
- IPA: [t͡ɕʌŋ.miʝʌn]

Meehyun Chung (Korean: 정미현; born 1963) is a professor of the United Graduate School of Theology in Yonsei University and serving as the first female chaplain of Yonsei University. She was the editor of Korean Journal of Systematic Theology (ISSN 1226-3656). She is a distinguished female theologian who has been awarded both the Karl Barth Prize and the Marga Bührig Prize.

She is a constructive theologian working at the intersection of systematic theology, gender theory, ecumenism and sustainable development. Her research interests focus on the relationship between European theology and theology from the Global South, or the relationship between the Reformed tradition and feminist ideas regarding critical reflection on power, spirituality and social justice. She published several books in German: one of her books, Reis und Wasser: Eine Feministische Theologie in Korea, where she examines and critiques the Korean culture and the adaptation reformed tradition in Korean theology and churches. She recently published some other books in Korean: Theological Inquiry of the Czech Tradition (Seoul: Yonsei University Press, 2015); Lillias Horton Underwood (Seoul: Yonsei University Press, 2015).

== Education ==
Born and raised in South Korea, Meehyun Chung received her Ba.chelors' Arts in German Language and Literature and Masters' Art in systematic theology from Ewha Woman's University in Seoul, Korea and her Dr. theol. in Systematic Theology from The University of Basel. In 1993 she received doctoral degree in Basel, her thesis being on Karl Barth, Josef Lukl Hromadka and Korea.

== Work ==
In 2006 she was awarded the Karl-Barth prize of the Union of Protestant Churches within the EKD (Evangelische Kirche Deutschland) for her doctoral thesis and other articles. She also received Marga Buehrig prize in 2013. She named one of ten key Reformed theologians by the World Communion of Reformed Churches (WCRC) in 2017.

She is an ordained minister of the Presbyterian Church in the Republic of Korea (PROK). She served as Vice president between 2001-2006 for the Ecumenical Association of Third World Theologians. (EATWOT) She also served as the Head of Women and Gender desk of mission 21 in Basel, Switzerland. Before she took this position, she taught undergraduate and graduate courses in theology and Christianity at Ewha Woman's University. Since March 2013 she has been teaching as Professor of Yonsei University and serving as the first female chaplain of Yonsei University. She has published several articles on contemporary theological issues in the Global South and North in Korean, German, and English. In her work, she seeks to stage critical conversations among global North and South, and Reformed traditions on contemporary issues.

== Doctoral Dissertation ==
- Karl Barth, Josef Lukl Hromádka, Korea: Das Verständnis von Offenbarung und Geschichte im Denken Karl Barths : ein Vergleich mit dem Offenbarungs- ... Tätigkeit (Dahlemer Heft) (German Edition)

== Articles ==
- “Mission in Unity. A Study on the Multidimensional Works of Oliver R. Avison from the Perspective of Sustainable Development Goals,” International Review of Mission, 2021/110, 295-311.
- “Centennial Commemoration of the Death of Lillias Horton Underwood,” Yonsei Medical Journal 2021 Oct;62(10):873-876.
- “Karl Barth and Korean Theology, Past and Present,” Karl Barth and Liberation Theology, eds. Kaitlyn Dugan and Paul Dafydd Jones (London: T&T Clark 2023), 85-98.
- “Protestant Theology in Korea,” In St Andrews Encyclopaedia of Theology, edited by Brendan N. Wolfe et al. University of St Andrews, 2024.
- “Hermeneutic of resilience: Korean women’s seeking of justice, ” [Re]Gained in Translation II. Bible, Histories, and Struggles for Identity (Berlin: Frank&Timme, 2024), 341-356.

== Selected works ==
(translation into Korean)

- J.M. Lochman, Das lebendige Erbe, (Seoul: PROK theol.Institut), 1996.
- Ina Praetorius, "Entzug der Fürsorglichkeit. Feministische Ethik und Naturwissenschaft", in: Christian Thought 11/1996, 145-154.
- K. Barth, Letzte Zeugnisse, (Seoul: Handl), 1997.
- S. Heine, Frauen der frühen Christenheit, (Seoul: Ewha Uni. Press), 1998.
- M. Haas, Huldrich Zwingli, (Seoul: PROK theol.Institut), 1999.
- D. Sölle, Es muss doch mehr als alles geben, (Seoul: Handl), 2000.
- L. Vischer, Was haben Naturkatastrophen mit unserem Lebensstil zu tun?, in: The Word and the Church, vol. 22, Seoul 1999.
- L. Vischer, Mission in Unity, in: The Word and the Church, vol. 23, Seoul 2000.
- J.P. Newell, Listening for the Heartbeat of God. A Celtic Spirituality, (Seoul: Korean Christian Society), 2001.
- R.H. Oehninger, Das Zwingliportal im Grossmünster Zürich, (Seoul: PCK Press) 2002.
- J.M. Lochman, Life in the Truth, in: Christian Thought, 2002, July Seoul.
- H. U. Jäger, Wiederbelebung der Reformierten Spiritualität, (Seoul: PCK Press), 2004.
- C. Stückelberger, Umwelt und Entwicklung. Eine sozialethische Orientierung, (Seoul: Korean theol. Institute) 2006.
- D. Sölle, Mystik und Widerstand. Du stilles Geschrei, (Seoul: Ewha Uni. Press) 2007.
- Huldrich Zwingli, Göttliche und Menschliche Gerechtigkeit, in: The Word and the Church (Seoul:PROK theol.Institut) Nr. 46, 2008.
- J. Staedtke. Johannes Calvin: Erkenntnis und Gestaltung, (Seoul: Manoo and Changkong), 2009.
- P. Opitz, Leben und Werk. Johannes Calvin, (Seoul: Handl), 2012.
- K. Barth, KD, IV/3-1, (Seoul: Korean Christian Society), 2016.

(Edition)

- Meehyun Chung, ed.) Breaking Silence-Theology from Asian Women, (India: ISPCK), 2006.
- Meehyun Chung/E. Miescher, eds.), Weaving dreams, (Berlin:Frank & Timme), 2009.
- Meehyun Chung/R. Jansen, eds.), Reconciliation and Transformation, (Basel: Reinhardt Verlag), 2009.
- Meehyun Chung, ed.), Voices from West African Women, (India: ISPCK), 2010.

(Book)

- K. Barth-J.L. Hromadka-Korea, (Berlin: Alektor Verlag) 1995 (in German, Dissertation)
- Another discourse of Korean Feminist Theology, (Seoul: Handl), 2007. (in Korean)
- Reis und Wasser. Eine Feministische Theologie in Korea, (Berlin: Frank und Timme), 2012. (in German)
- Liberation and Reconciliation. Feminist Theology's Relevance for Korea, (Geneva: World Council of Churches), 2014. (in English)
- Theological Inquiry of the Czech Tradition, (Seoul: Yonsei University Press), 2015. (in Korean)
- Lillias Horton Underwood, (Seoul: Yonsei University Press), 2015. (in Korean)
