= Hans Zingg =

Canadian scientist

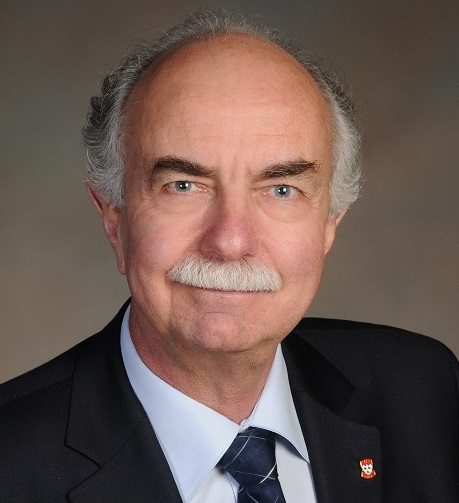
- Born: Hans Heinrich Zingg; December 15, 1944 (age 81); Zurich, Switzerland
- Occupations: Professor, Researcher, Physician
- Known for: Oxytocin, oxytocin receptor
- Awards: Senior Scientist Award, Canadian Institute for Health Research, CIHR (1999); Wyeth-Ayerst Chair in Reproductive Endocrinology, PMAC/MRC, Canada (1999 – 2004); Distinguished Scientist Award, Canadian Society for Clinical Investigations, CSCI (2000)

Academic background
- Education: University of Basel, Switzerland; McGill University, Montreal, Canada

Hans H. Zingg is professor emeritus in the Department of Pharmacology & Therapeutics at McGill University in Montreal, Quebec, Canada.

== Biography ==
He earned his Doctor of Medicine (M.D.) from the University of Basel in Switzerland, followed by a Doctor of Philosophy (Ph.D.) in Experimental Medicine from McGill University. He then completed post-doctoral training at Harvard Medical School.

He joined McGill University in 1984 and eventually rose to the rank of Full Professor in the Departments of Medicine, Pharmacology and Therapeutics, as well as Obstetrics and Gynecology.

Before becoming the chair of the Department of Pharmacology and Therapeutics from 2002 to 2011, he acted as Director of the Laboratory of Molecular Endocrinology at the old Royal Victoria Hospital and associate director for Fundamental Research at the MUHC Research Institute.

== Research ==
Work in his lab focused on the molecular mechanisms of oxytocin and oxytocin receptor gene expression and the mechanisms of oxytocin-mediated intracellular signalling.

His research mostly addressed the molecular mechanisms of oxytocin. Amongst other things, he showed that the oxytocin, a pituitary hormone, was also produced in the uterus and contributed to labor and childbirth.

In 1992, he demonstrated that oxytocin is not only a neuropeptide but is expressed in the uterine epithelium at term, where it acts locally as an autocrine/paracrine regulator contributing to labor and childbirth. This discovery led to a novel concept of uterine oxytocin action and established that the uterus contains its own intrinsic oxytocin system where the ligand oxytocin and its cognate receptor are both expressed in the same organ and, to some extent, in the same cells.

Work on cloning and characterization of the rat oxytocin receptor gene contributed to the elucidation of the mechanisms of its stage- and tissue-specific expression. Specifically, he showed that the genes for the receptor and its cognate ligand were subject to strict and very dramatic regulation during gestation and during the estrous cycle.

Finally, his work on the mechanisms of oxytocin action showed that the oxytocin receptor forms selective dimers with different members of the vasopressin receptor family as well as the beta2-adrenergic receptor and that this dimerization is of functional importance with respect to the receptor's signaling functions. Moreover, the spectrum of the intracellular signaling mechanisms coupled to the oxytocin receptor has been broadened by his demonstration that the receptor activates several MAP kinases.

== Honours ==
He was the holder of a Distinguished Scientist Award from the Canadian Society for Clinical Investigations (CSCI) and a Senior Scientist Award from the Canadian Institute for Health Research (CIHR). In 1999, he was awarded a Wyeth-Ayerst Clinical Research Chair in Women's Health. He is a member of the American Association of Physicians (AAP).
