= University of Basel =

Public university in Basel, Switzerland

- Universität Basel
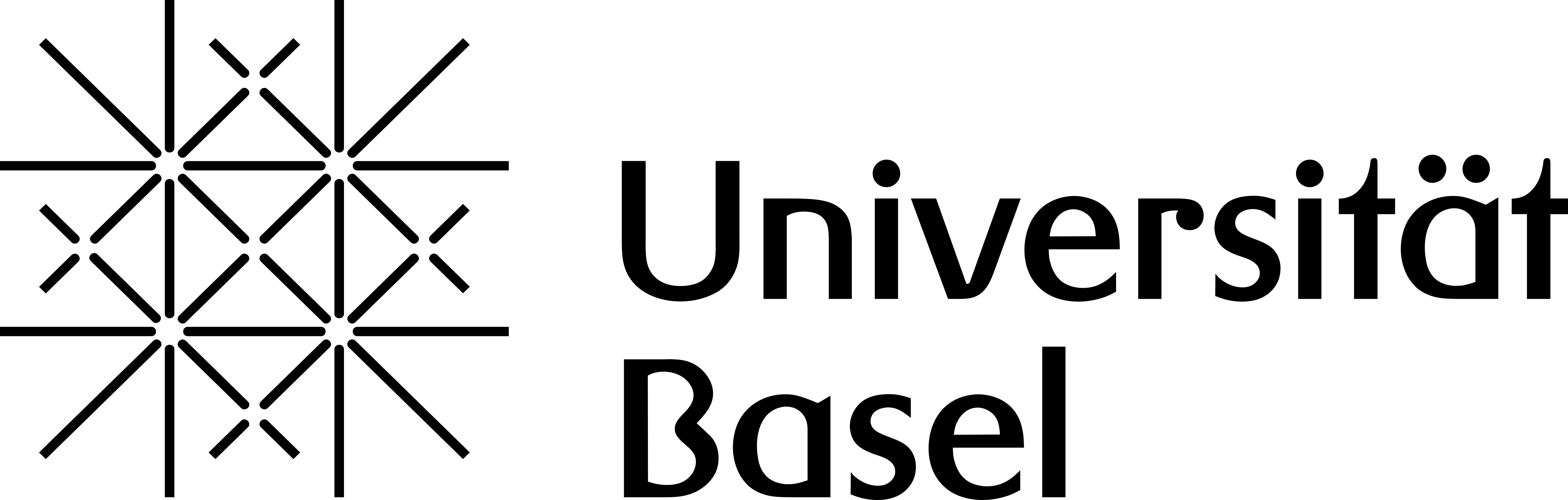
- Latin: Universitas Basiliensis
- Type: Public
- Established: 4 April 1460; 566 years ago
- Affiliations: Utrecht Network, EUCOR
- Budget: CHF 768 million (2020)
- President: Andrea Schenker-Wicki
- Academic staff: 4,700
- Students: 13,139
- Location: Basel, Basel-City, Switzerland; 47°33′31″N 07°35′00″E
- Colours: Mint, Red, Anthracite
- Website: unibas.ch

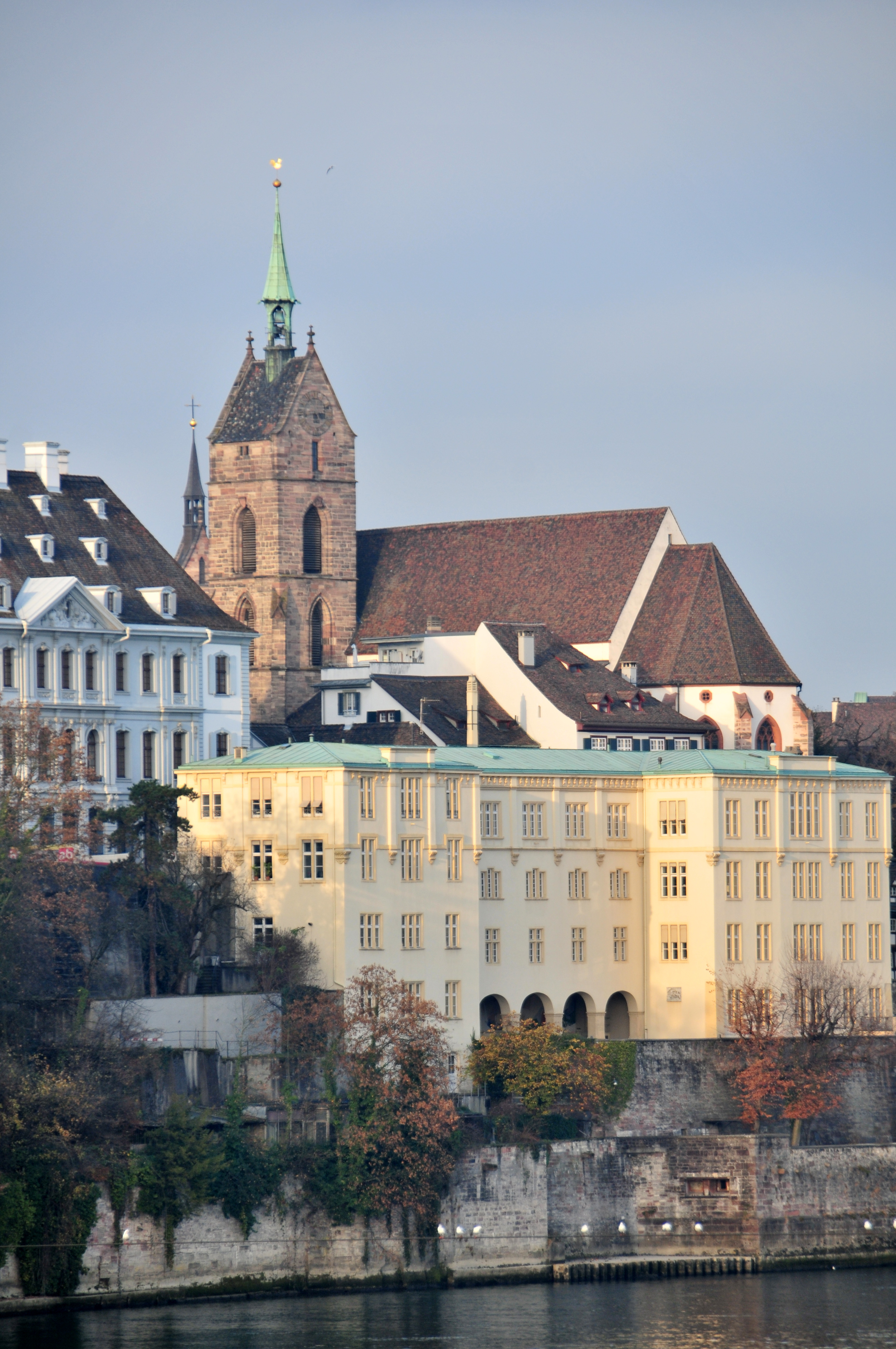
The old main building of the University of Basel, which with its arcades in the middle takes up the lines of the first Italian university in Bologna.

The University of Basel (Latin: Universitas Basiliensis; German: Universität Basel) is a public research university in Basel, Switzerland. Founded on 4 April 1460, it is Switzerland's oldest university and among the world's oldest universities. The university is traditionally counted among the leading institutions of higher learning in the country.

The associated Basel University Library is the largest and among the most important libraries in Switzerland. The university hosts the faculties of theology, law, medicine, humanities and social sciences, science, psychology, and business and economics, as well as numerous cross-disciplinary subjects and institutes, such as the Biozentrum for biomedical research and the Institute for European Global Studies. In 2020, the university had 13,139 students and 378 professors. International students accounted for 27% of the student body.

In its over 500-year history, the university has been home to Erasmus of Rotterdam, Paracelsus, Daniel Bernoulli, Leonhard Euler, Jacob Burckhardt, Friedrich Nietzsche, Tadeusz Reichstein, Karl Jaspers, Carl Gustav Jung, Karl Barth, and Jeanne Hersch. The institution is associated with ten Nobel laureates and two presidents of the Swiss Confederation.

== History ==
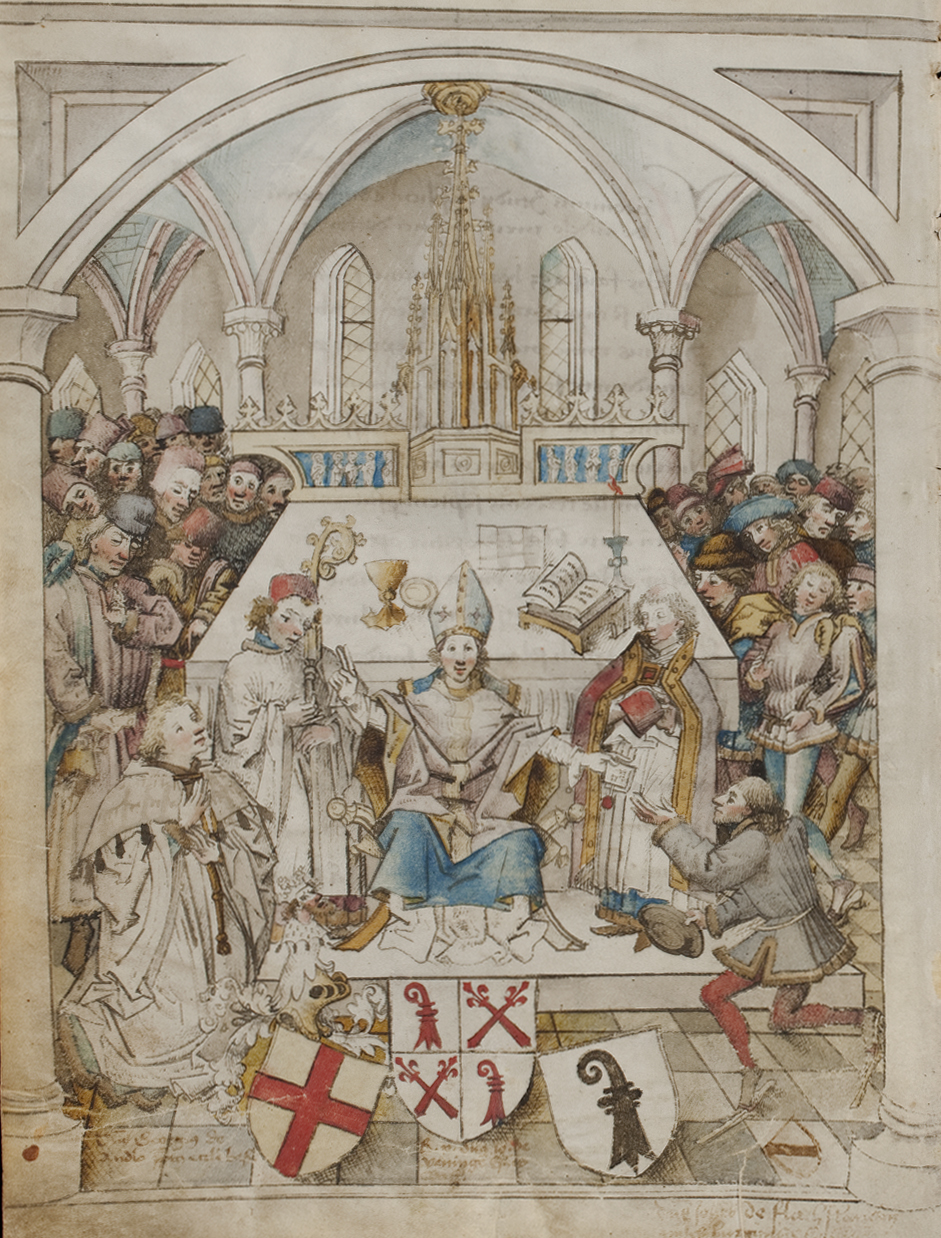
Inauguration ceremony of the University of Basel, 1460 (modern fantasy illustration redrawn from the Wurstisen-Chronik)

The University of Basel was founded in connection with the Council of Basel. It was during the years the catholic clergy resided in Basel, a temporary university was established between the years 1432 und 1448. In May 1432 it was authorized for Simon de Valla from Venice to lecture on canon law, in 1434 Jacques d'Attigny from France and was also permitted to lecture on canon law in Basel. d'Attigny had before been lecturing canon law at the University of Rome. In 1437 Demetrius was called to lecture Greek language. Also the function of a bedel is mentioned, but there was no mention of a dean or a university order. The same year Pope Eugene IV attempted to move the council to Ferrara, but many involved in Basel stayed and kept negotiating and in 1439 the council elected a counter pope in the figure of the Duke of Savoy Amadeus VIII, who would become known as Felix V. Felix V then established a formal "University of the Clergy" (German: Kurienuniversität), which was inaugurated in November 1440 with a mass in the Barfüsser Church. In 1448, the German King Frederick III came to an agreement with Pope Nicholas V, the successor of Eugen IV and ordered the city to remove the security of the councilors. The university was then formally closed in July 1448 and the clergy moved on to Lausanne. After they left, the former lecturers urged for a regular university to be established. The deed of foundation given in the form of a Papal bull by Pope Pius II on 12 November 1459 in Mantua and the official opening ceremony was held on 4 April 1460, the day of Saint Ambrose in the Minster of Basel. Originally the University of Basel was decreed to have four faculties—arts, medicine, theology, and jurisprudence. From 1497, the Grand Council of Basel discussed whether the university was to be closed and only in 1501, the year Basel joined the Swiss Confederation, it was decided not to close the university. The faculty of arts served until 1818 as the foundation for the other three academic subjects. In the eighteenth century as Basel became more commercial, the university, one of the centres of learning in the Renaissance, slipped into insignificance. Enrollment which had been over a thousand around 1600, dropped to sixty in 1785 with eighteen professors. The professors themselves were mostly sons of the elite.

Over the course of centuries as many scholars came to the city, Basel became an early centre of book printing and humanism. Around the same time as the university itself, the Basel University Library was founded. Today it has over three million books and writings and is the largest library in Switzerland.

Located in what was once a politically volatile area, the university's fate often ebbed and flowed with regional political developments, including the Reformation, the Kantonstrennung (separation of the Canton of Basel City from Basel Land), and both World Wars. These factors affected student attendance, funding, university-government relations. In 1833 the Canton of Basel split in two with the Federal Diet requiring that the canton's assets, including the books at the university library, be divided—two-thirds going to the new half canton of Basel-Landschaft. The city, Basel-Stadt, had to buy back this share and the university became so impoverished that it drastically reduced its course offerings. Students were expected to continue their education after two years or so at a German university.

Student enrollment surged after the university shed its medieval curriculum (including the elimination of Latin as the official language of the course catalog in 1822) and began to add more faculties, especially those in the humanities and sciences. Liberal Arts became a faculty in 1818, from which the Philosophy and History and Natural History faculties were derived in 1937. The university subsequently established the Faculty of Science (1937), the Faculty of Business and Economics (1996), and the Faculty of Psychology (2003). During the 20th century, the university grew rapidly, from one thousand students in 1918 to eight thousand in 1994. The first woman who was admitted to the university, Emilie Frey, began her medical studies in 1890.

After the seizure of power in the year 1933 by the Nazis in Germany, numerous renowned German professors decided to emigrate to Basel and started to work at the University of Basel. Several Swiss scholars also returned, inter alia the Law Professor Arthur Baumgarten (1933), the Theologians Karl Barth (1935) and Fritz Lieb (1937), and after World War II the Philosopher Karl Jaspers from Heidelberg University (1948), as well as the surgeon Rudolf Nissen (1952).

On 1 January 1996, the University of Basel became independent from the cantonal government and thus earned its right to self-government. In 2007, the Canton of Basel-Landschaft voted in favor to share the sponsorship of the university in parity with the Canton Basel-Stadt.

=== Seal ===
Since 1460, the seal of the university showed a Virgin surrounded with sun rays standing a crescent moon as mentioned in the Revelation of John. Below the moon is the coat of arms of Basel. In her right hand, she holds a scepter, and on her left arm sits Jesus the child. The religious motive is described to denote the religious bond the university counted with at the beginning of its existence. The seal was also used after the reformation and used continuously until 1992.

== Reputation and rankings ==
University rankings

Global – Overall
- ARWU World: 95 (2024)
- QS World: 158 (2026)
- THE World: =123 (2024)
- USNWR Global: =168 (2024-25)

Well-respected rankings attest to the University of Basel's international academic performance:

- Times Higher Education World University Ranking (THE) (2021): 92
- CWTS Leiden Ranking (2019): 53
- Academic Ranking of World Universities (ARWU) (2019): 87

== Organisation ==
=== University administration ===
Since 1 January 1996, the University of Basel has been independent. The University Law of 1995 stipulates that, "The University of Basel is an institution established under public law. It has its own legal personality and right to self-government." As the entity that formally receives the Performance Mandate (Leistungsauftrag) for the university from both supporting cantons, the University Council (Universitätsrat) is the supreme decision-making body of the university. The council consists of eleven voting members and three non-voting members, including the president, the executive director, and the secretary of the council. Beneath the University Council are the Senate (Regenz) and the President's Board. The 80-member Senate consists of the senior members of the President's Board, faculty deans, professors, lecturers and research assistants, assistants, students, and administrative and technical employees. The President's Office is tasked with leading the overall university business. It consists of the president and her staff, a General Secretariat, an Administrative Directorate, the Communications and Marketing Office, and two respective vice-presidents for research and education.

=== Faculties and departments ===
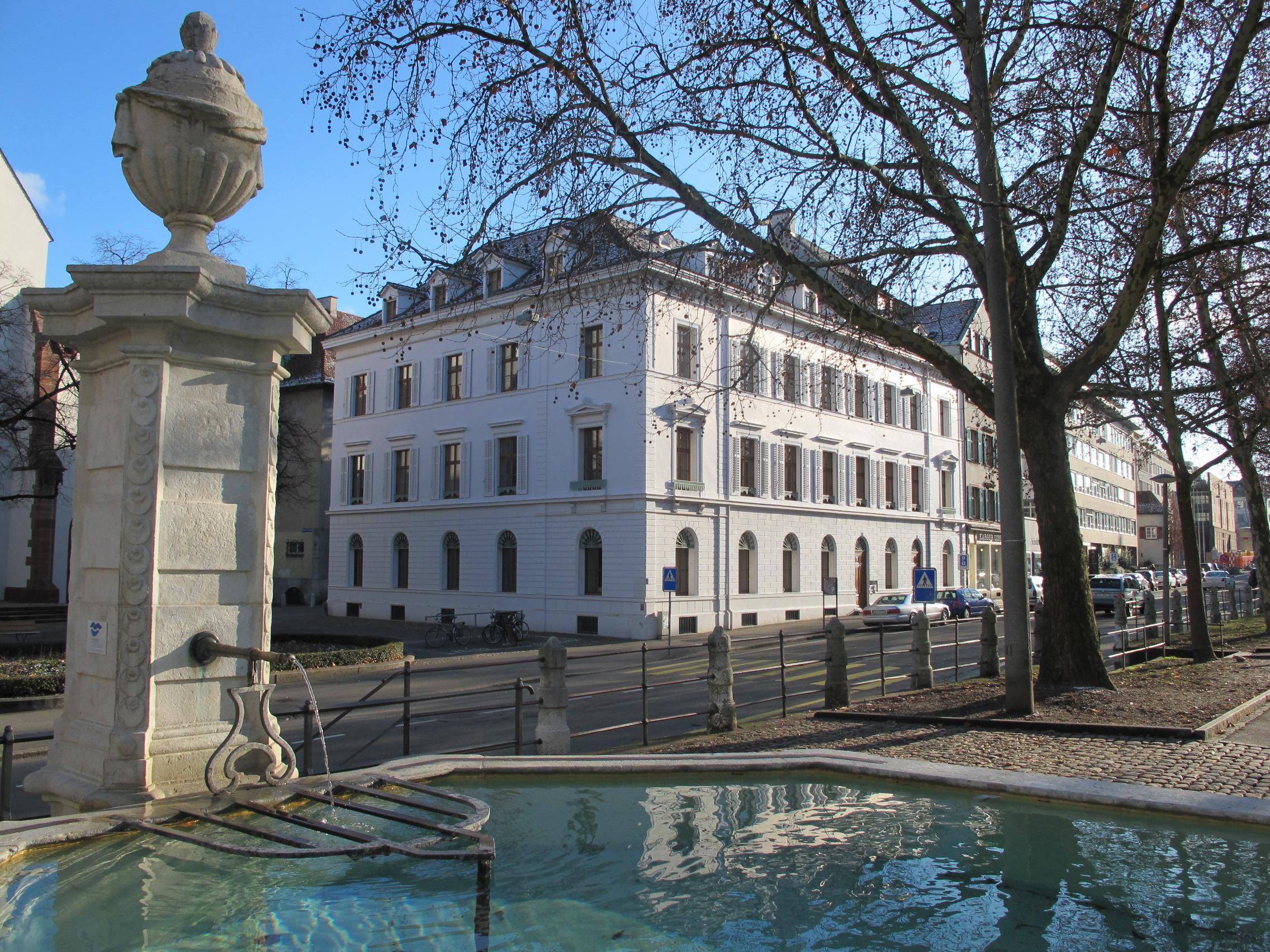
Institute of Musicology

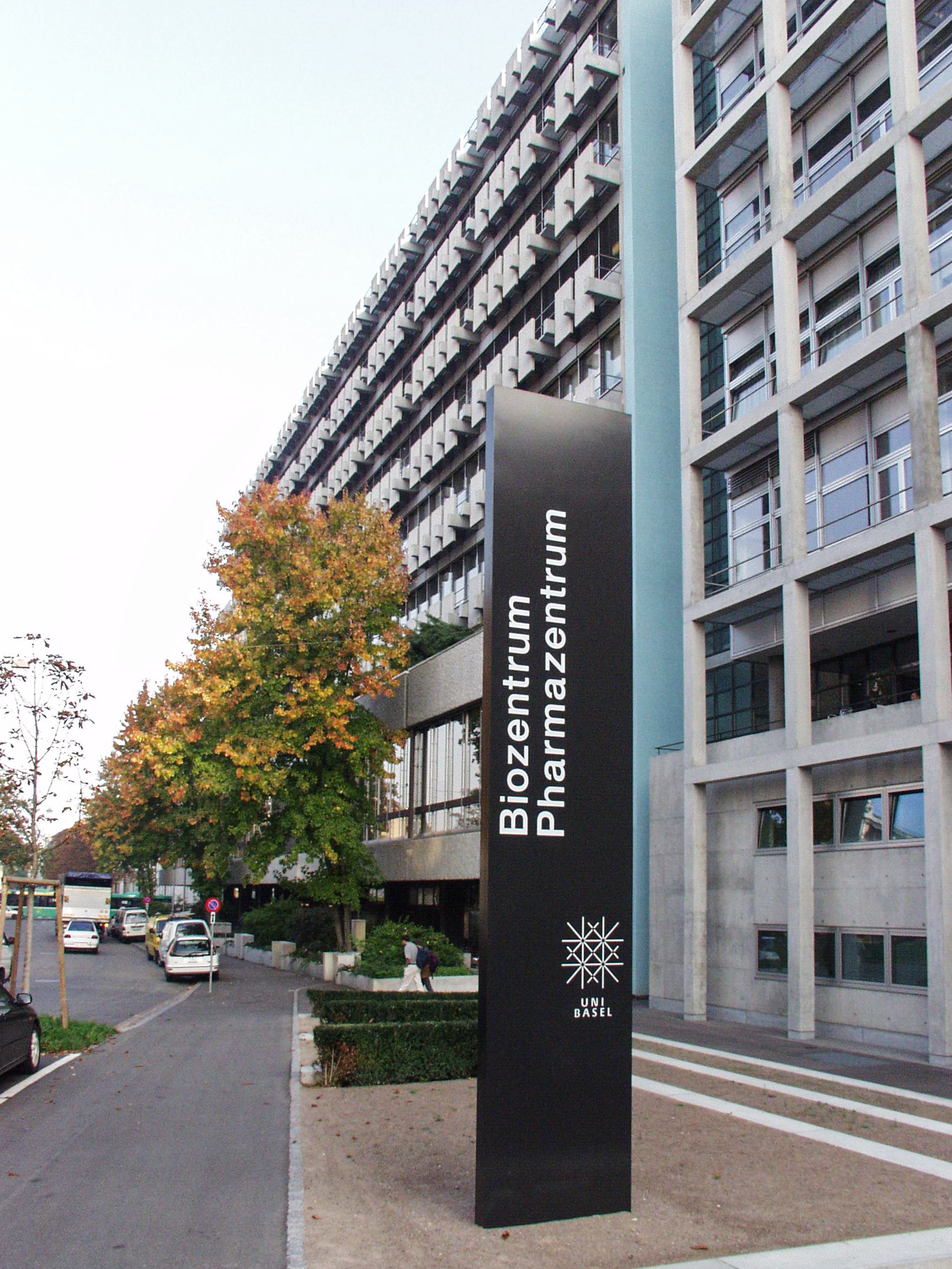
Biozentrum and Department of Pharmaceutical Sciences

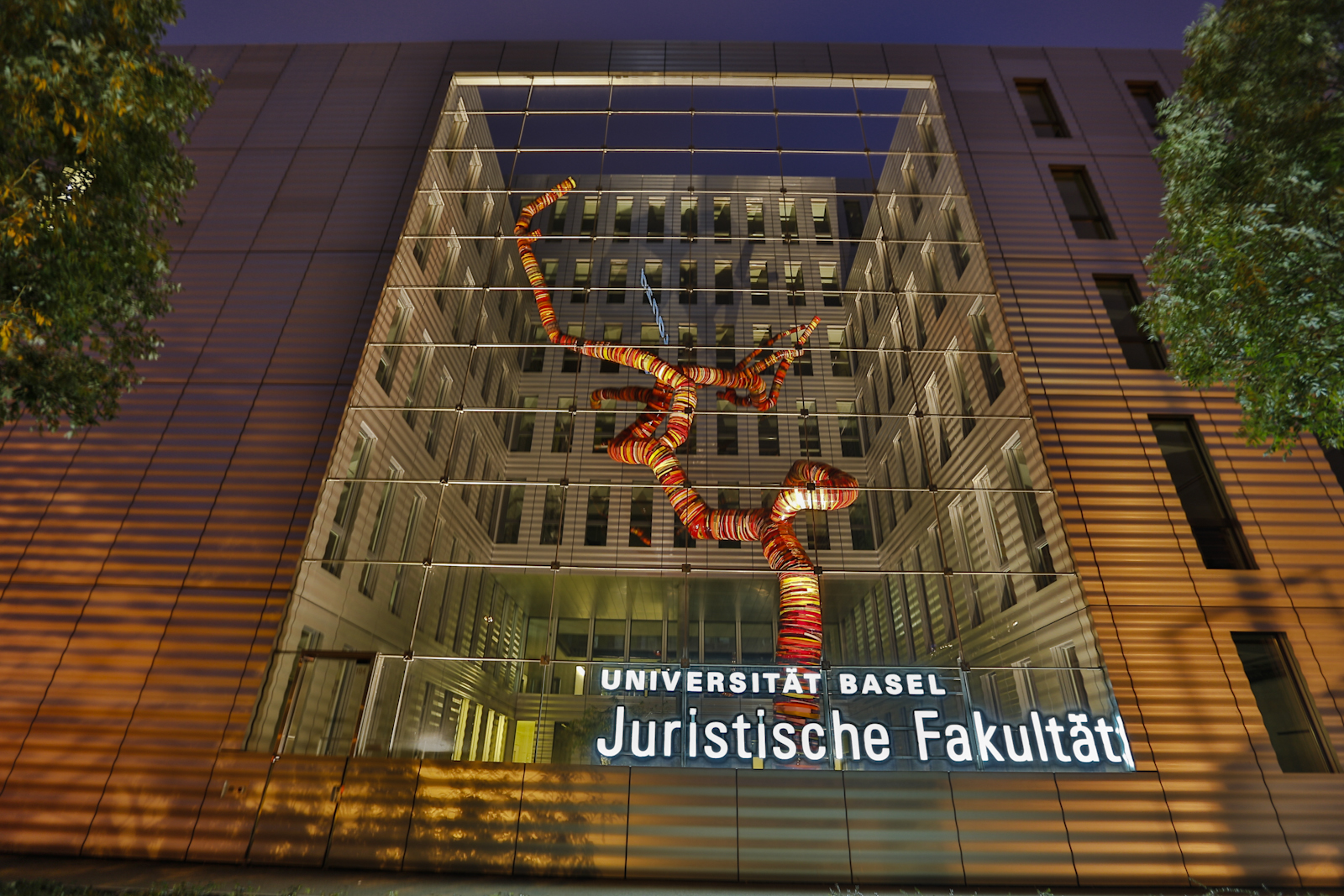
Faculty of Law

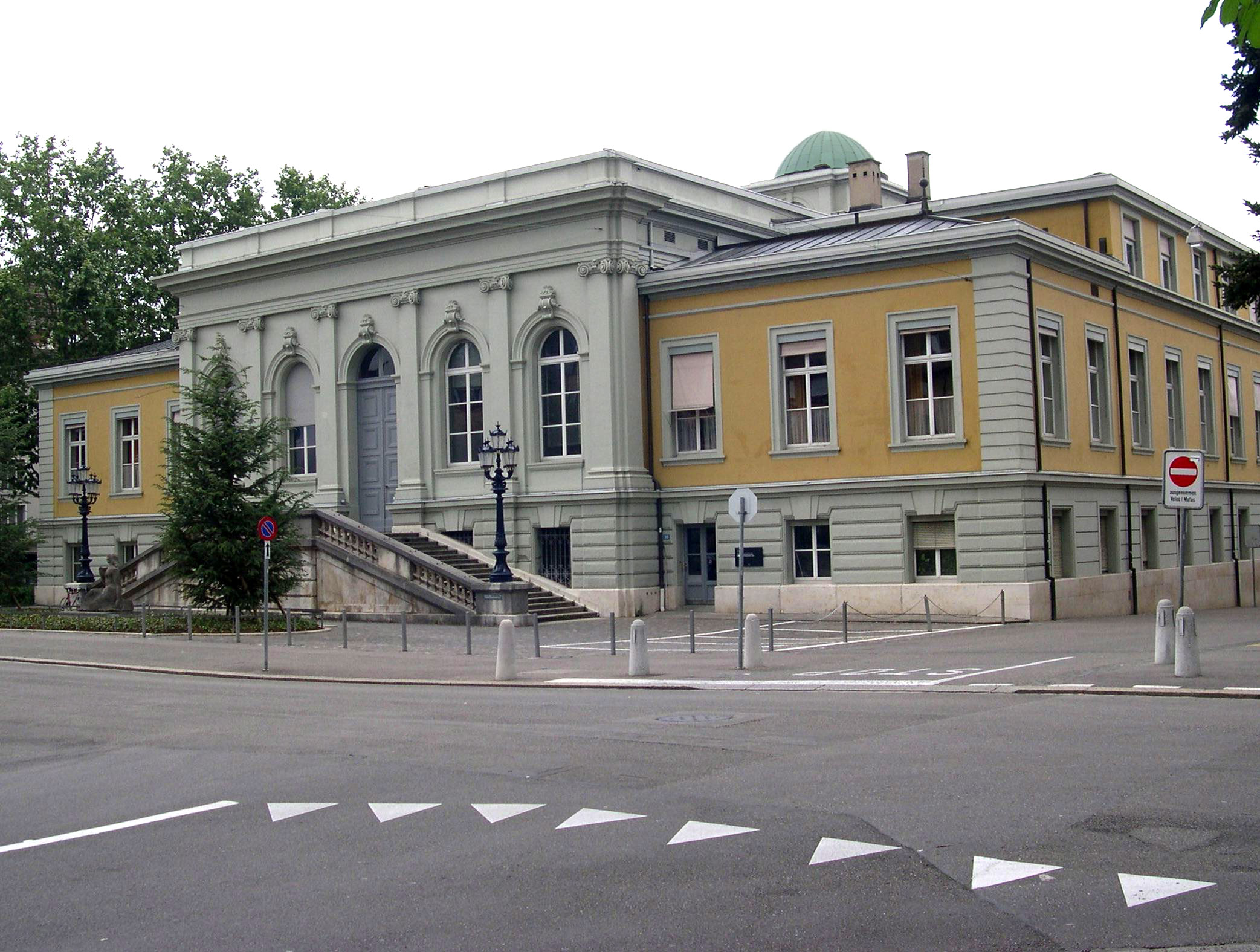
Bernoullianum, Department of Environmental Sciences

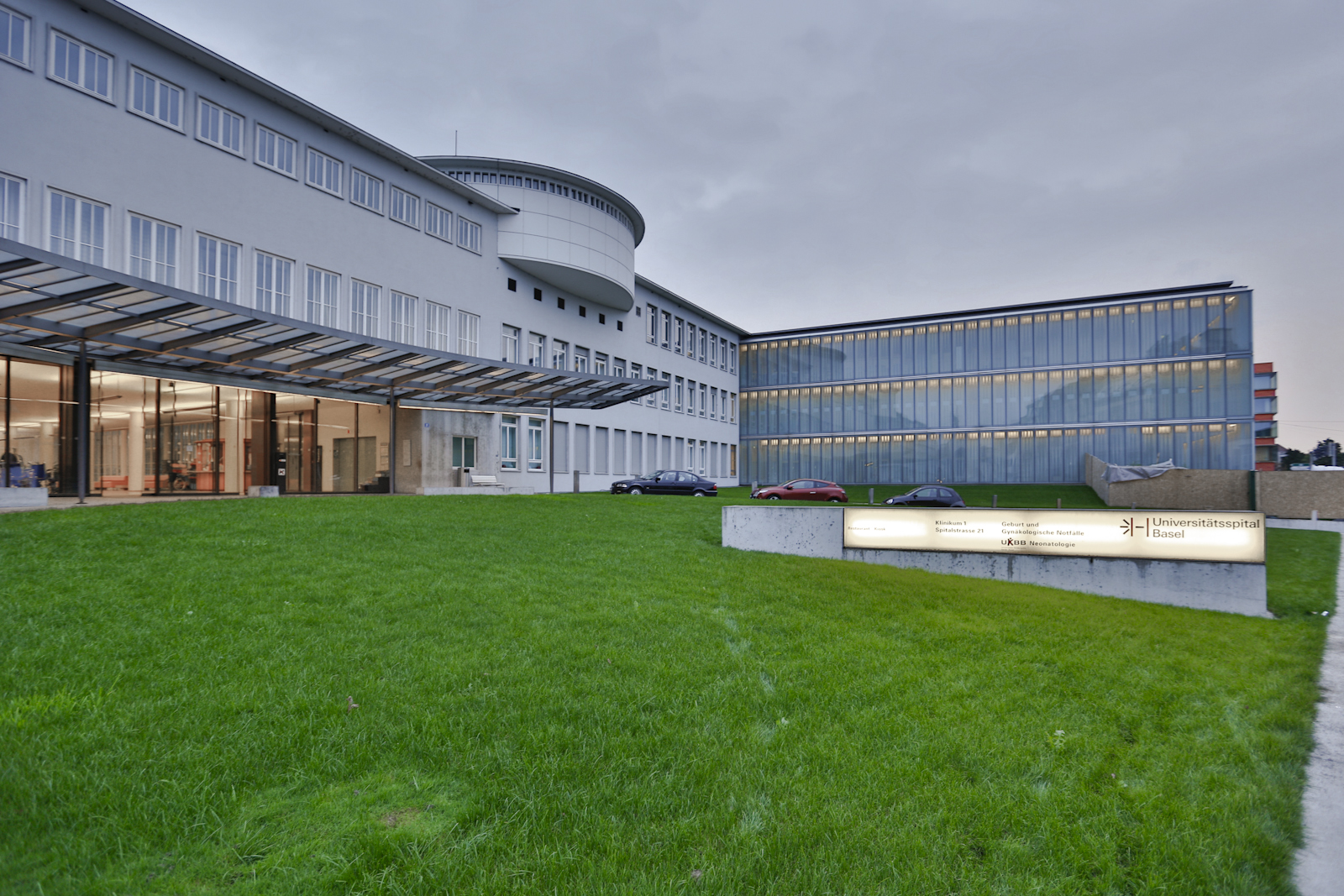
University Hospital of Basel

The University of Basel currently houses seven faculties:

- Theology
- Law
- Medicine
  - Department of Biomedicine (a joint venture among the University of Basel, the University Hospital, and the University Children's Hospital)
  - Department of Biomedical Engineering
  - Department of Public Health
  - Department of Clinical Research
  - Department of Sport, Exercise and Health
- Humanities and Social Sciences (Phil I)
  - Department of Ancient Civilizations
  - Department of History
  - Department of Social Sciences
  - Department Arts, Media, Philosophy
  - Department of Languages and Literatures
  - Digital Humanities Lab
- Science (Phil II)
  - Biozentrum
  - Department of Mathematics and Computer Science
  - Department of Physics
  - Department of Chemistry
  - Department of Environmental Sciences
  - Department of Pharmaceutical Sciences
- Business and Economics
- Psychology

=== Interdisciplinary institutions ===
- Institute for European Global Studies
- Center for Philanthropy Studies (CEPS)
- Institute for Biomedical Ethics (IBMB)
- Institute of Education

=== Associated institutes ===
- Swiss Tropical and Public Health Institute (Swiss TPH)
- Friedrich Miescher Institute for Biomedical Research (FMI)
- Basel Institute on Governance
- Swiss Centre for Rescue, Emergency and Disaster Medicine (SZRNK)
- Swisspeace

== Notable alumni and faculty ==
The university is counted among the country's leading institutions of higher learning and has a large number of politicians, scientists and thinkers as professors and alumni from around the world:

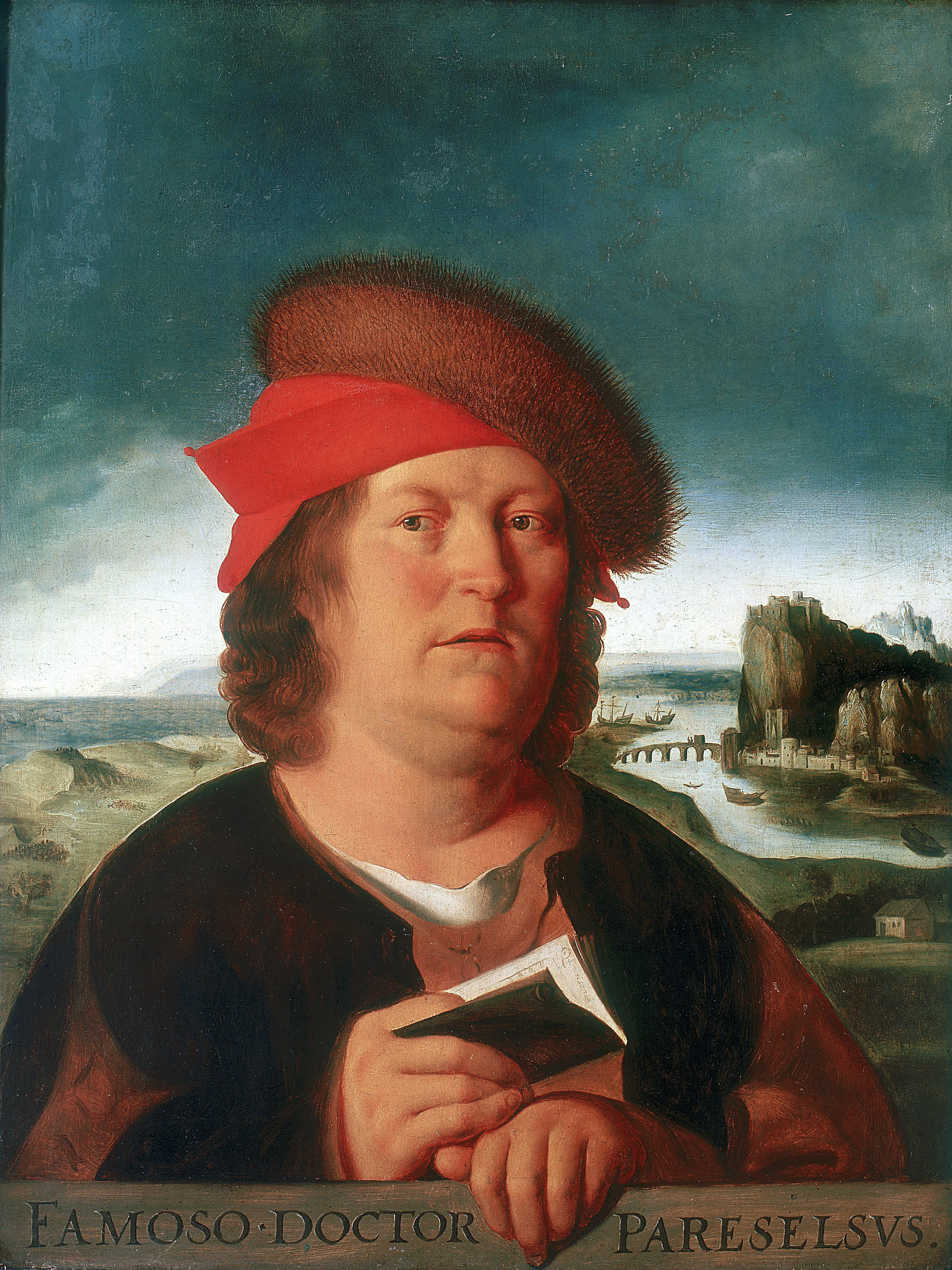
Paracelsus, physician and alchemist

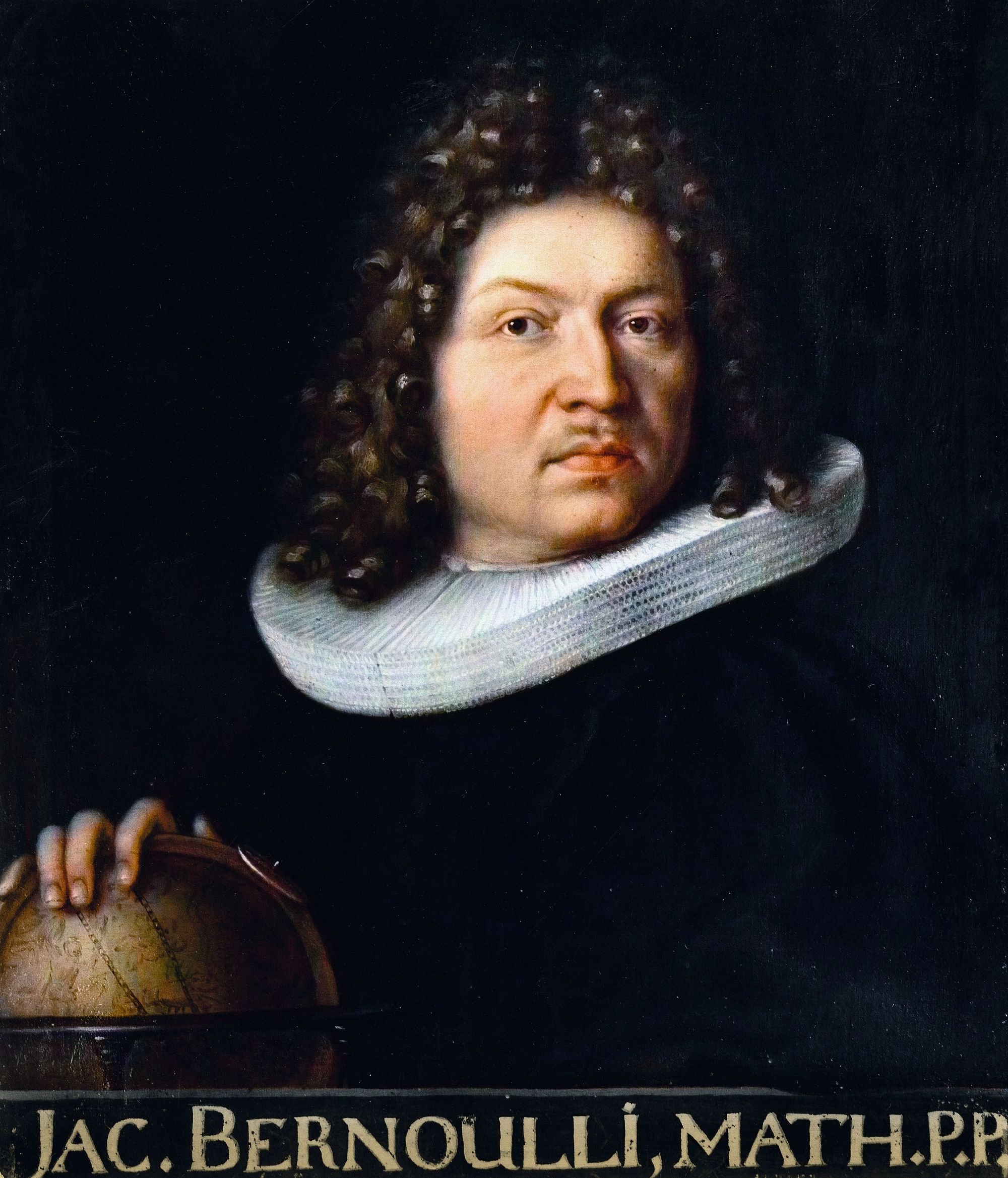
Jacob Bernoulli, mathematician

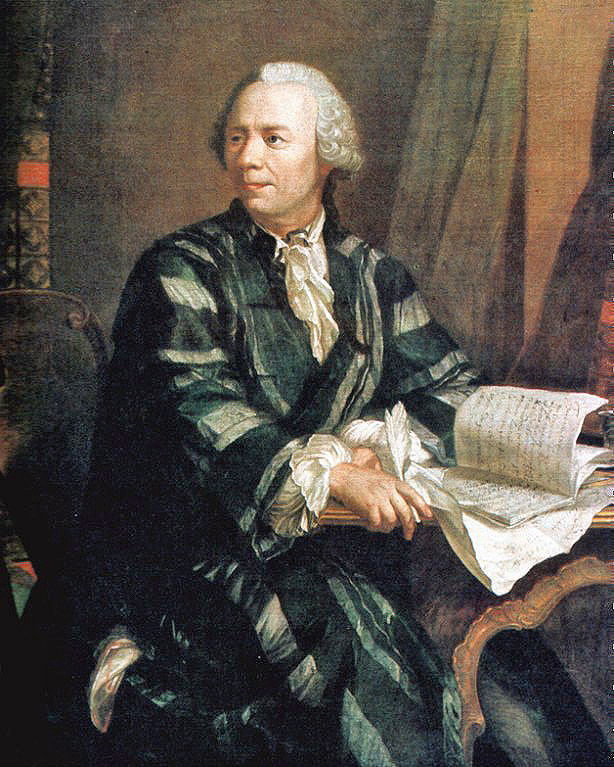
Leonhard Euler, mathematician and physicist

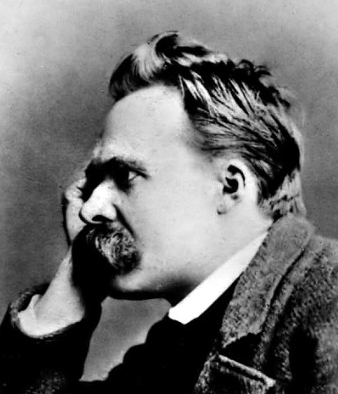
Friedrich Nietzsche, philosopher

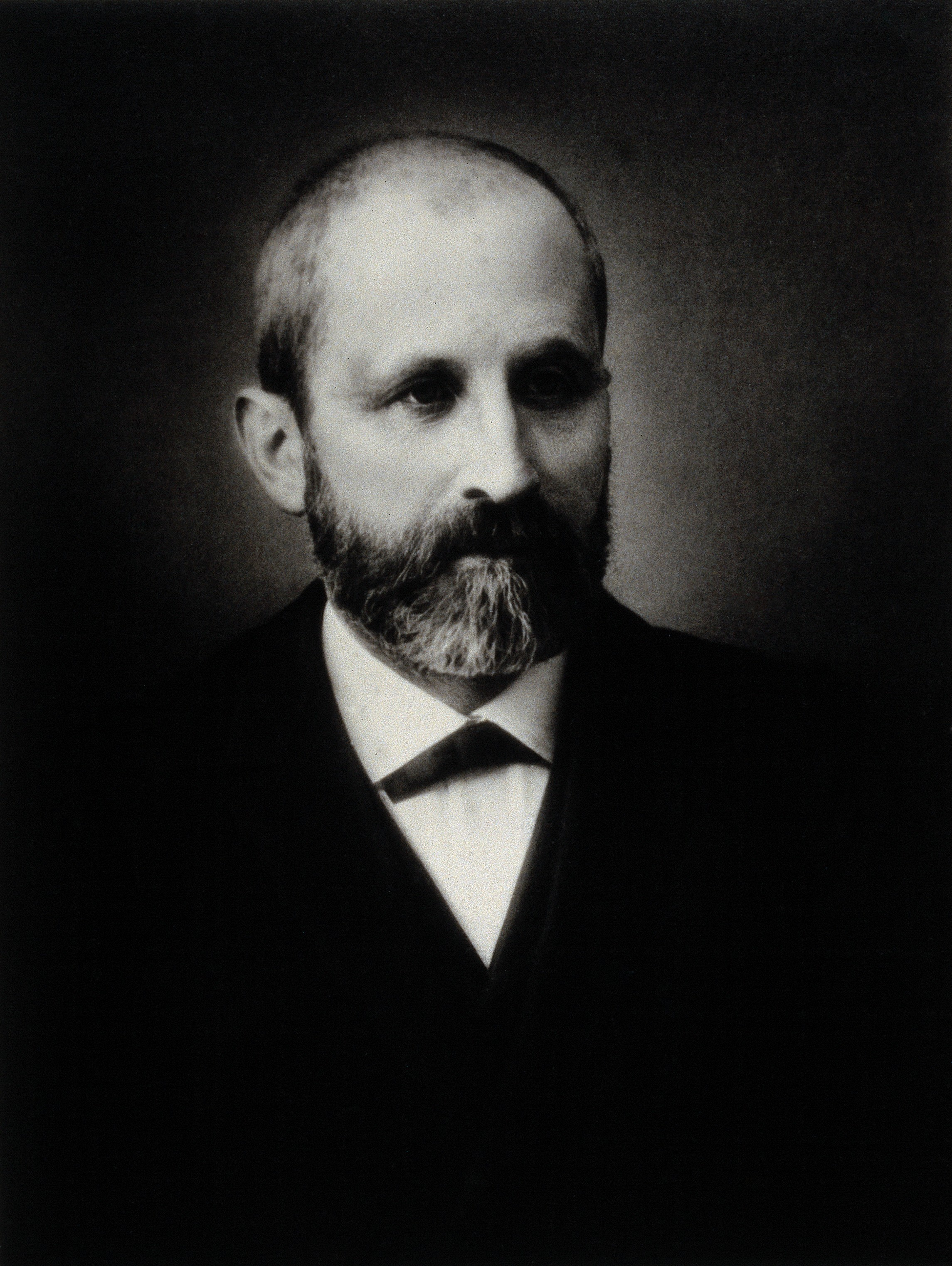
Friedrich Miescher, physician

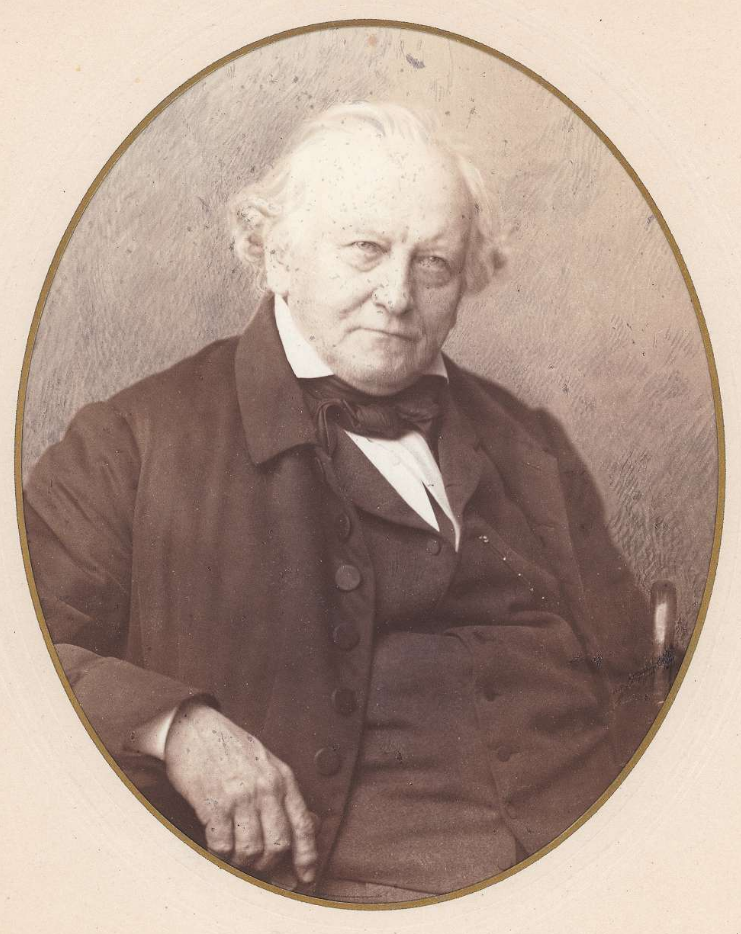
Karl Gustav Jung, physician and surgeon

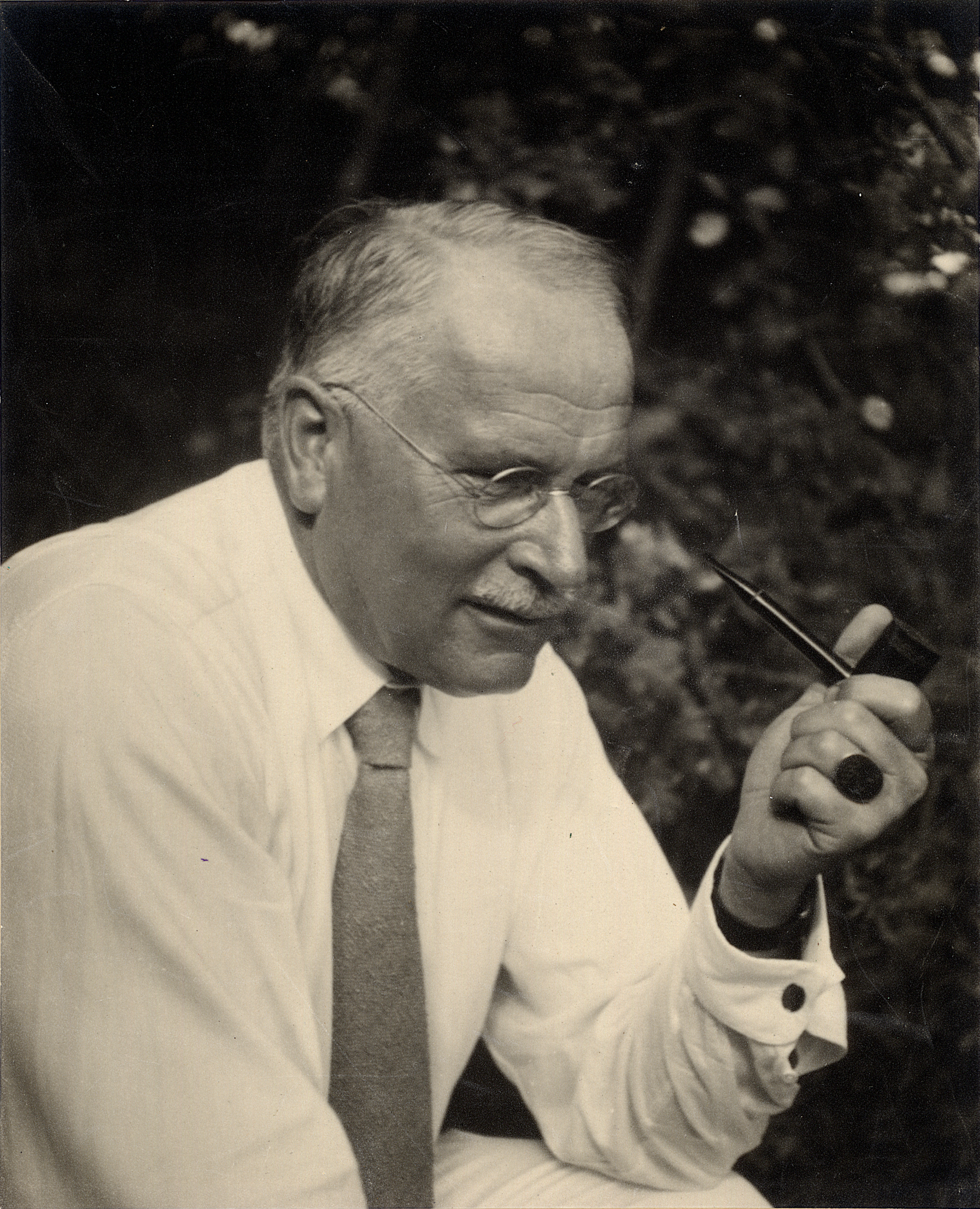
Carl Gustav Jung, psychiatrist

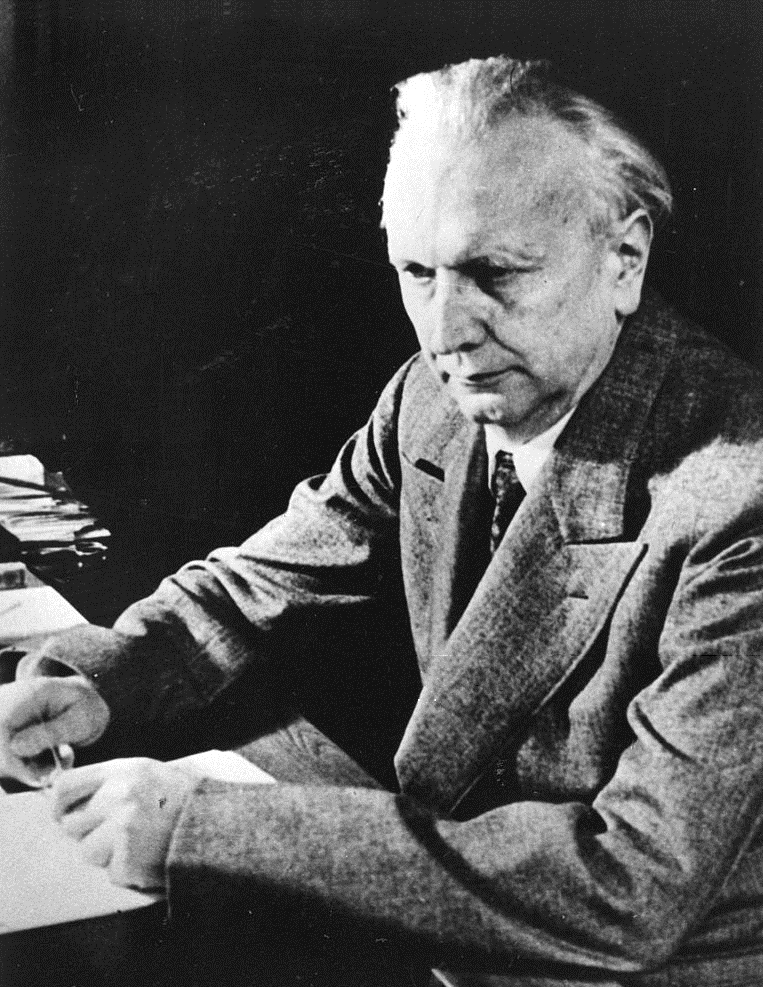
Karl Jaspers, philosopher and psychiatrist

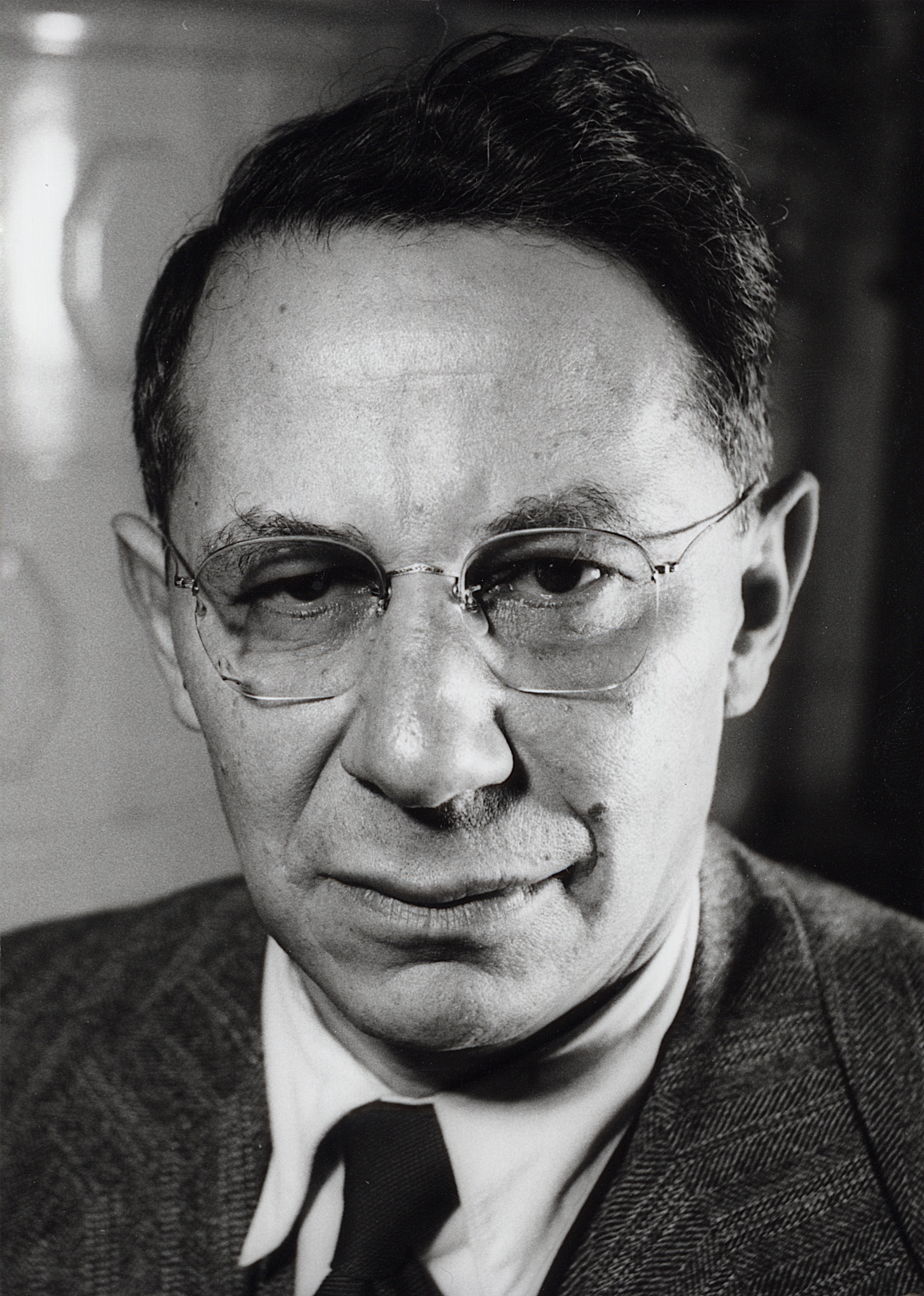
Tadeus Reichstein, chemist and Nobel Prize laureate

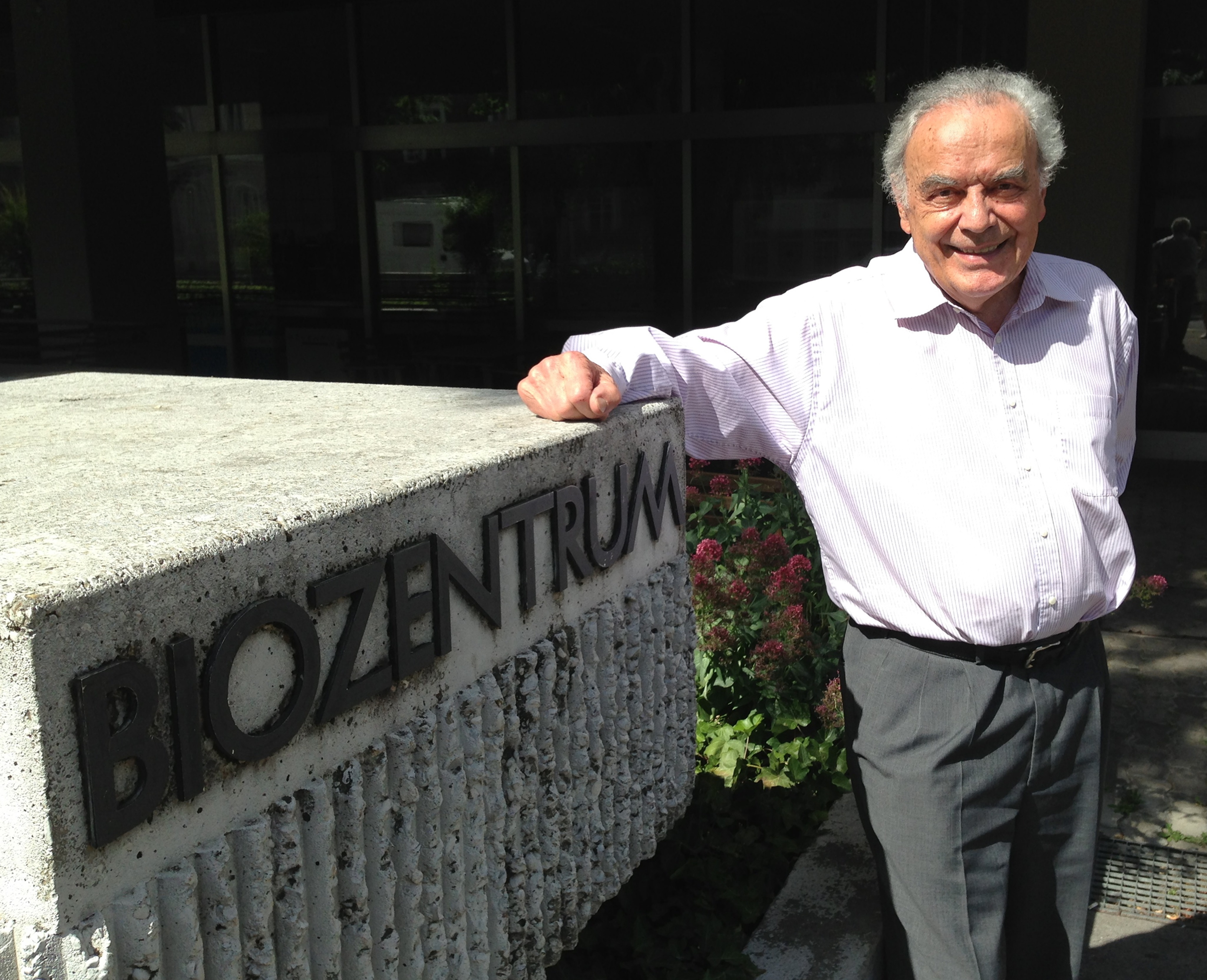
Werner Arber, microbiologist and Nobel Prize laureate

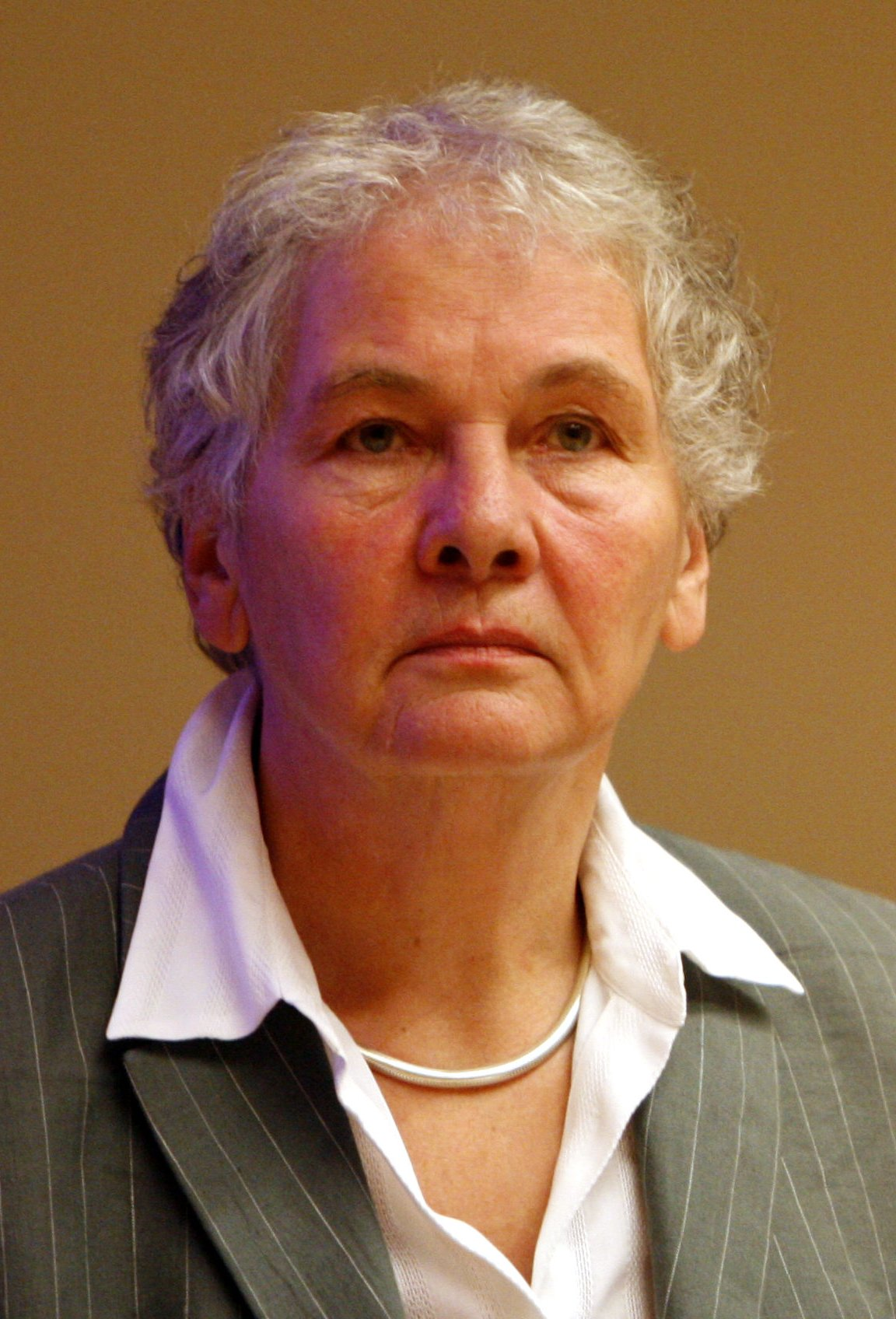
Christiane Nüsslein-Volhard, biologist and Nobel Prize laureate
- Emil Abderhalden (1877–1950), Swiss biochemist and physiologist
- Bonifacius Amerbach (1495–1562) Swiss jurist
- Johann Konrad Ammann (1669–1724, Swiss physicist and educator of deaf children)
- Werner Arber (1929–), Swiss microbiologist and geneticist, Nobel Prize in Physiology or Medicine in 1978
- Johann Jakob Bachofen (1815–1887), Swiss antiquarian and jurist
- Karl Barth (1886–1968), Swiss Protestant theologian
- Caspar Bauhin (1560–1624), Swiss botanist
- Johann Bauhin (1541–1613), Swiss botanist
- Daniel Bernoulli (1700–1782), Swiss mathematician and physicist
- Jacob Bernoulli (1655–1705), prominent Swiss mathematician, after whom Bernoulli numbers are named
- Johann Bernoulli (1667–1748), Swiss mathematician
- Johann Georg Birnstiel (1858–1927), Swiss writer and clergyman
- James Montgomery Boice (1938–2000), American theologian and pastor
- Jacob Burckhardt (1818–1897), Swiss historian
- Meehyun Chung (1963–) South Korean theologian, professor of Yonsei University
- Jacques Dubochet (1942–), Swiss biophysicist, Nobel Prize in Chemistry in 2017
- Nikolaus Eglinger (1645–1711), Swiss physician
- Paul Erdman (1932–2007), American business and financial writer
- Leonhard Euler (1707–1783), mathematician and physicist
- Rudolf Eucken (1846–1926), philosopher, Nobel Prize in Literature in 1908
- Till Förster (1955), Prof.em.Dr., anthropologist, founding director of the Centre for African Studies, University of Basel
- Christoph Gerber professor at the Department of Physics, co-inventor of the atomic force microscope
- Fina Girard (2001–), Swiss politician and youth climate activist
- Albert Gobat (1848–1914), Swiss politician, Nobel Peace Prize in 1902
- Arno David Gurewitsch (1902–1974), professor, Columbia‐Presbyterian Medical Center, and personal physician to Eleanor Roosevelt
- Paul Herrling, professor of Drug Discovery Science
- Jeanne Hersch (1910–2000), Swiss philosopher
- Robert Jacob (physician) (died 1588), English court physician to Elizabeth I and the Russian Czarina
- Karl Jaspers (1883–1969), German-Swiss psychiatrist and philosopher
- Karl Gustav Jung (1795–1864), German-Swiss physician and surgeon, Rector and professor of the University
- Carl Gustav Jung (1875–1961), Swiss psychiatrist, and founder of Analytical Psychology
- Eberhard Jüngel (1934–2021), German Lutheran theologian
- Jack Dean Kingsbury (1931–), American New Testament theologian and professor at Union Presbyterian Seminary
- Michael Landmann (1913–1984), Swiss-Israeli philosopher
- Yeshayahu Leibowitz (1903–1994), Israeli public intellectual and polymath
- Friedrich Miescher (1844–1895), Swiss physician and biologist, first researcher to isolate nucleic acid
- Alice Miller (1923–2010), Swiss psychologist and author
- David-François de Montmollin (1721–1803), Swiss colonist to Canada, Protestant minister, landowner
- Paul Hermann Müller (1899–1965), Swiss chemist, Nobel Prize in Physiology or Medicine in 1948
- Annegret Mündermann, professor in the field of regenerative medicine & biomechanics
- Friedrich Nietzsche (1844–1900,) German philosopher, held Chair of Classical Philology at the University of Basel at the age of 24
- Christiane Nüsslein-Volhard (1942–), German biologist and biochemist, Nobel Prize in Physiology or Medicine in 1995
- Paracelsus (1493–1541), Swiss philosopher, physician, botanist and astrologer
- Tadeus Reichstein (1897–1996), Polish-Swiss chemist, Nobel Prize in Physiology or Medicine in 1950
- John H. Rodgers Jr. (1930–2022), American systematic theologian and Anglican bishop
- Otto Stich (1927–2012), President of the Swiss Confederation
- Emmanuel Stupanus (1587–1664), Swiss physician
- William Theilheimer (1914–2005), German-American scientist
- Lilian Uchtenhagen (1928–2016), Swiss politician and economist
- Peter Werenfels (1627–1703), Swiss theologian
- Kurt Wüthrich (1938–), Swiss chemist, Nobel Prize in Chemistry in 2002
- Iona Yakir (1896–1937), Red Army commander
- Rolf Zinkernagel (1944–), Swiss physician, Nobel Prize in Physiology or Medicine in 1996
- Hans Zingg (M.D.) — professor emeritus of pharmacology and therapeutics, professor of medicine, professor of obstetrics and gynecology, and Wyeth-Ayerst Chair in Women's Health at McGill University
- Mirjana Spoljaric Egger (1972–), Swiss diplomat, the president of the International Committee of the Red Cross (ICRC)

== Student life ==
The university hosts several formal institutions that are intended to serve the needs of its students. The Student Advice Center provides advice on academic degree programs and career opportunities. The Student Services provides information on applications, grants, mobility, exchanges, and disability services.

=== Student organisations ===
There are also a variety of organisations that cater to international students, such as local chapters of Toastmasters and AIESEC, and associations that perform community services (Beraber, for instance, provides remedial lessons to immigrant youth). There is a foreign affairs association (Foraus), a Model United Nations team, and various choirs and orchestras. There are also various religious groups.A number of other student groups exist out of formal venues. The most recognisable are the "Studentenverbindungen," traditional student associations dating from the 19th century that organise social events, share common uniforms, and often focus on particular hobbies, such as sword fighting. Such associations include the Akademische Turnerschaft Alemannia zu Basel, AKW Raurica, Helvetia Basel, Jurassia Basiliensis, Schwizerhüsli, A.V. Froburger, and Zofingia. Membership in many is restricted to men, though A.V. Froburger also accepts women.

=== University sports ===
University Sports provides a gym, fitness classes, and sport and dance camps to students and employees of the university.

=== Student union ===
The Studentische Körperschaft der Universität Basel (skuba) speaks on behalf of the students and represents their needs and interests. It acts as an official student representative and has no political or religious affiliations.

== Alumni association ==
The university has a general alumni association, AlumniBasel, as well as specific alumni associations for the Europainstitut, Medicine, Law, Business and Economics, Dentistry, and Nursing.

== See also ==
- Biozentrum University of Basel
- List of largest universities by enrollment in Switzerland
- List of medieval universities
- Basel University Library
