= Volcher Coiter =

Dutch anatomist

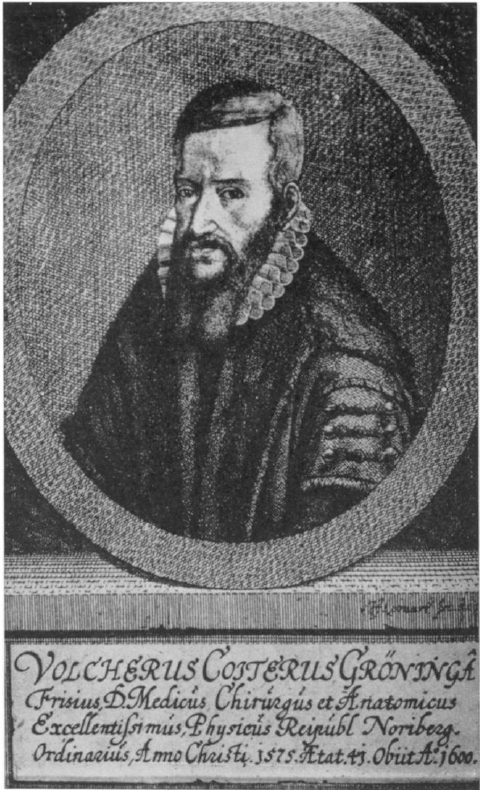
- Born: 1534; Groningen
- Died: 2 June 1576 (aged 41–42); Brienne-le-Château
- Scientific career
- Fields: Anatomy
- Academic advisors: Ulisse Aldrovandi; Gabriele Falloppio; Bartolomeo Eustachi; Guillaume Rondelet

Volcher Coiter (also spelled Coyter or Koyter; Latin: Volcherus Coiterus; 1534 – 2 June 1576) was a Dutch anatomist who established the study of comparative osteology and first described cerebrospinal meningitis. He also studied the human eye and was able to demonstrate the replenishment of the aqueous humor. Coiter's muscle is a name sometimes used for the corrugator superciliaris that is involved in wrinkling of the eyebrow. He illustrated his works with his own meticulously detailed drawings.

== Biography ==
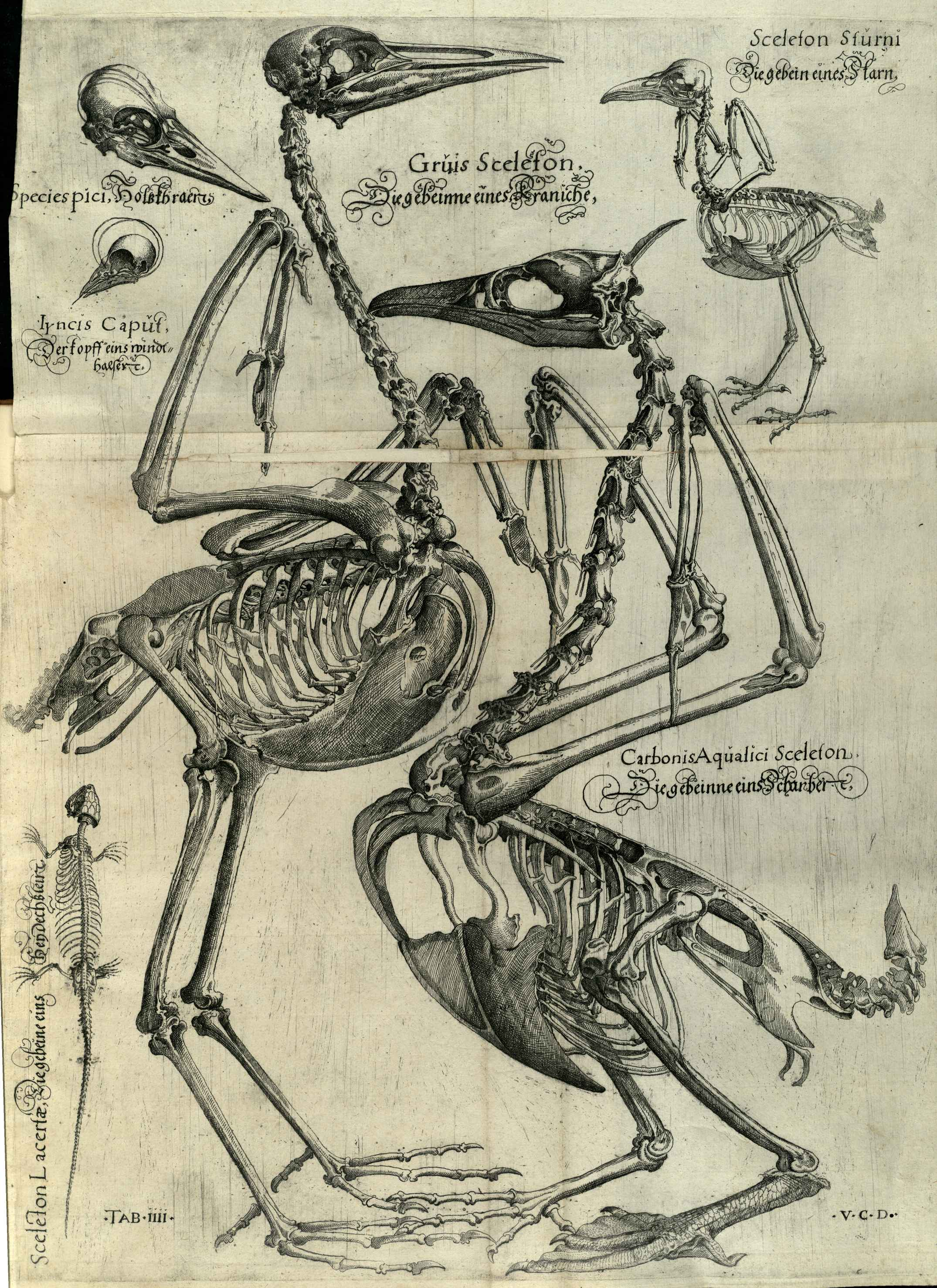
Skeletons of a cormorant, a starling, a crane, skulls of a woodpecker and wryneck. Illustrations by Coiter

Coiter was born in a patrician family in Groningen. His father was a jurist and he studied initially under Regnerus Praedinius at the St. Martin's School in Groningen. Excelling in Latin, dialectics and mathematics, he received a stipend from the city to study abroad for five years which led him to study from 1555 in Italy and France and was a pupil of Ulisse Aldrovandi and Giulio Arenzi in Bologna; Gabriele Falloppio in Padua; Bartolomeo Eustachi in Rome; and Guillaume Rondelet. In Montpelier he met Felix Platter. He spent some time in Tübingen, possibly studying under Leonhart Fuchs. He graduated in 1562 with a doctor of arts and medicine and returned to Bologna in 1563 as a teacher. He often clashed with barber surgeons. In 1565 he was sent to jail in Rome partly because he was a Protestant but was released by assistance from Germans and then was forced to leave Italy. He moved to Amberg serving as physician to the Duke of Bavaria before he became city physician of Nuremberg in 1569. He was often asked to conduct autopsies and dissect criminals who had been condemned to death. He published several works on human anatomy, wrote on the merits of medicinal baths, and wrote notes on the lectures of Falloppio. In 1575 he took part in the French Wars of Religion as field surgeon to Count Palatine Johann Casimir who went into France to support the Huguenots. He returned ill and died in Champagne during the German forces' return march. His widow Helena was forced to deal with his debts.

His works included Externarum et Internarum Principalium Humani Corporis Partium Tabulae (1572) and De Avium Sceletis et Praecipius Musculis (1575). His work included detailed anatomical studies of birds and included careful illustrations made by him signed "V.C.D." (=Volcher Coiter Delineat). Among his other works was a classification of the birds based on structure and habits. His works on human anatomy included studies of the ear, and the eye. He described the corrugator muscles above the eye (which cause the wrinkling of the eyebrow) which are sometimes called Coiter's muscles. He also examined the development of chicken embryos inside eggs. He also examined the bones of a human foetus. He produced an early dichotomous classification key based on anatomical characters. He was said to have played the lute and taught Felix Platter to play the harp.

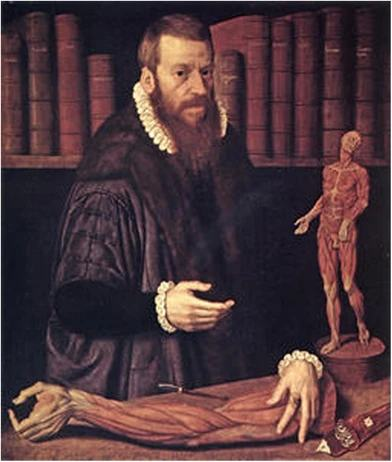
1575 portrait of Coiter in Nürnberg with an écorché

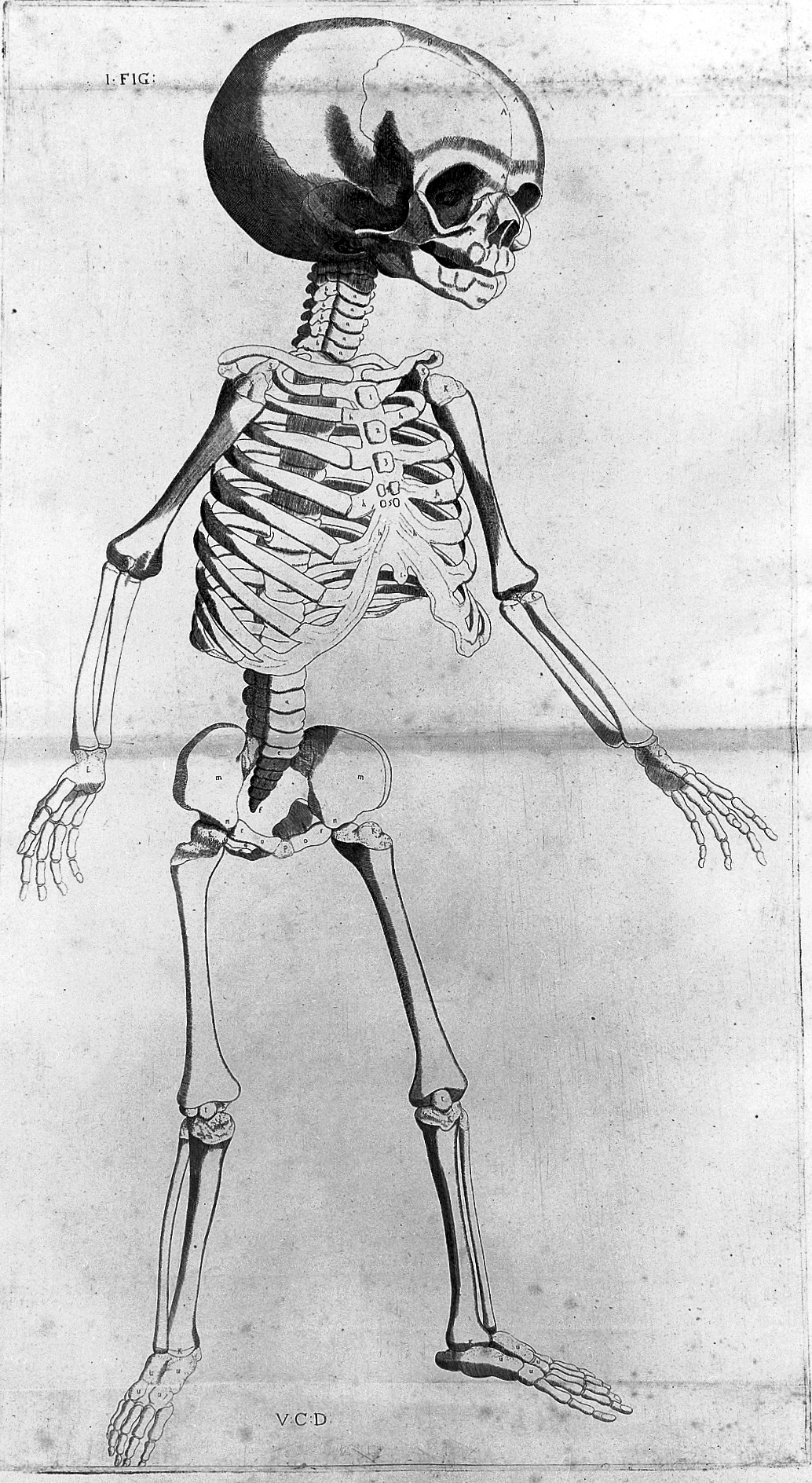
Illustration of a foetus by Coiter

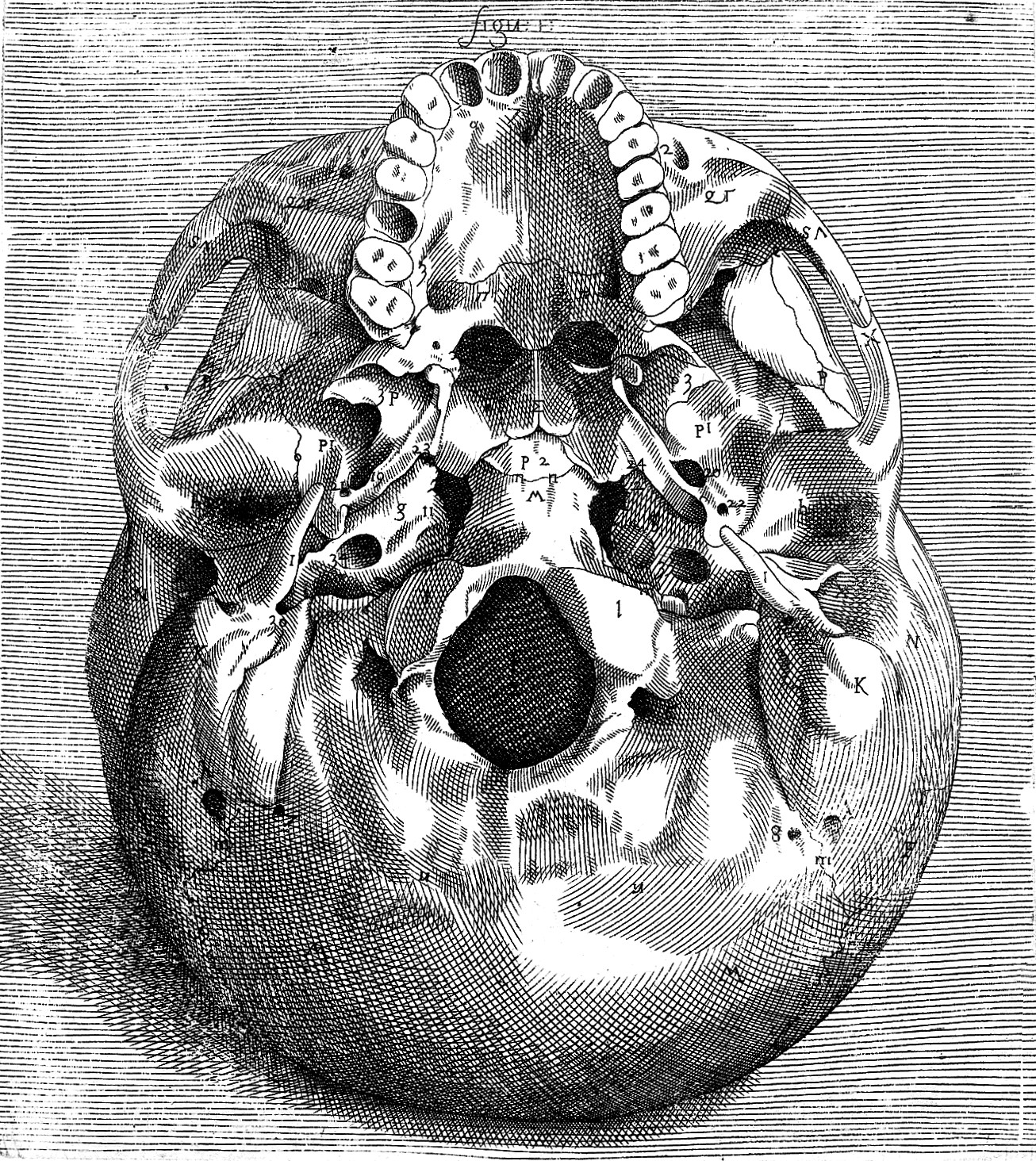
Illustration of human skull by Coiter

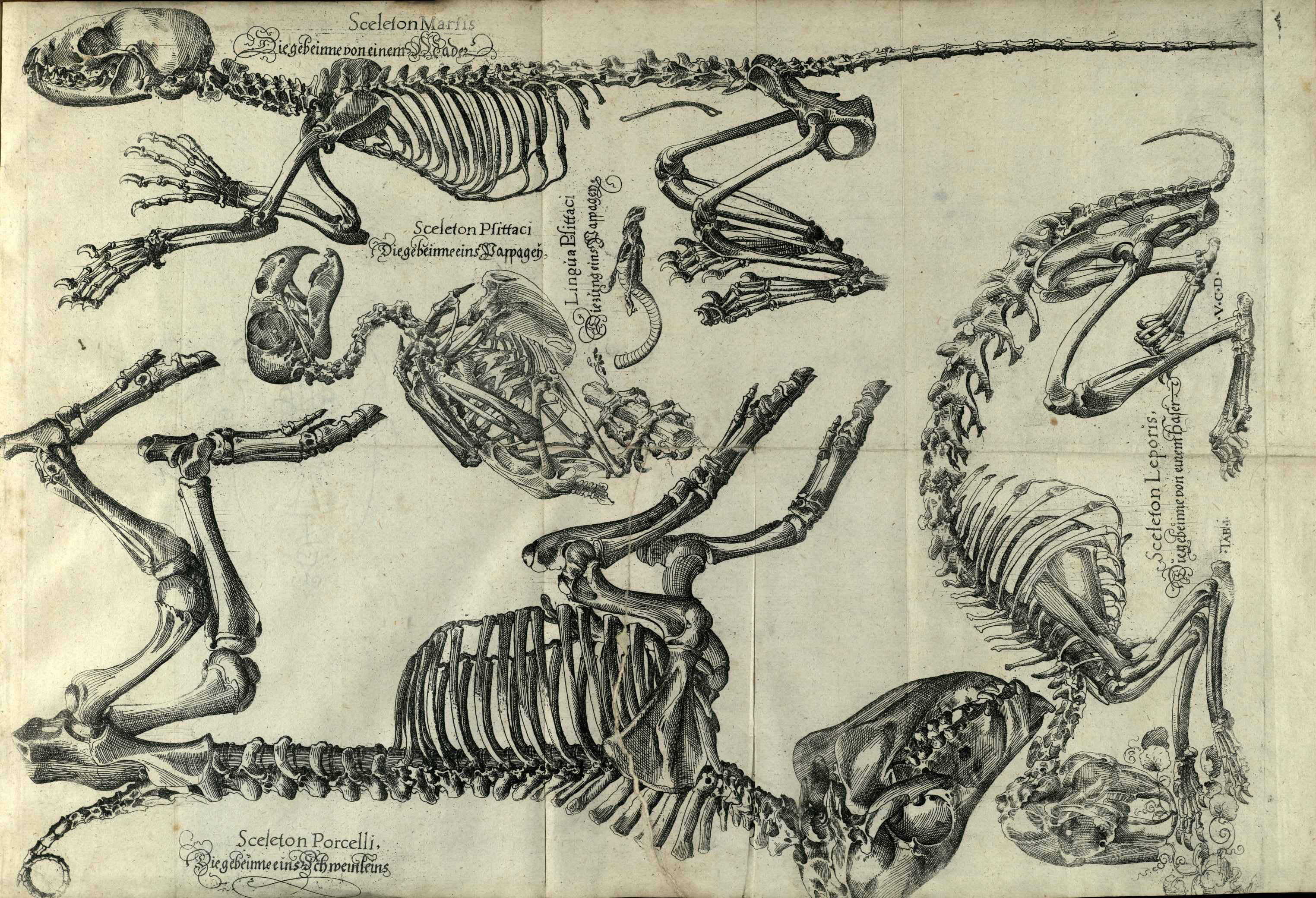
Skeletons of quadrupeds

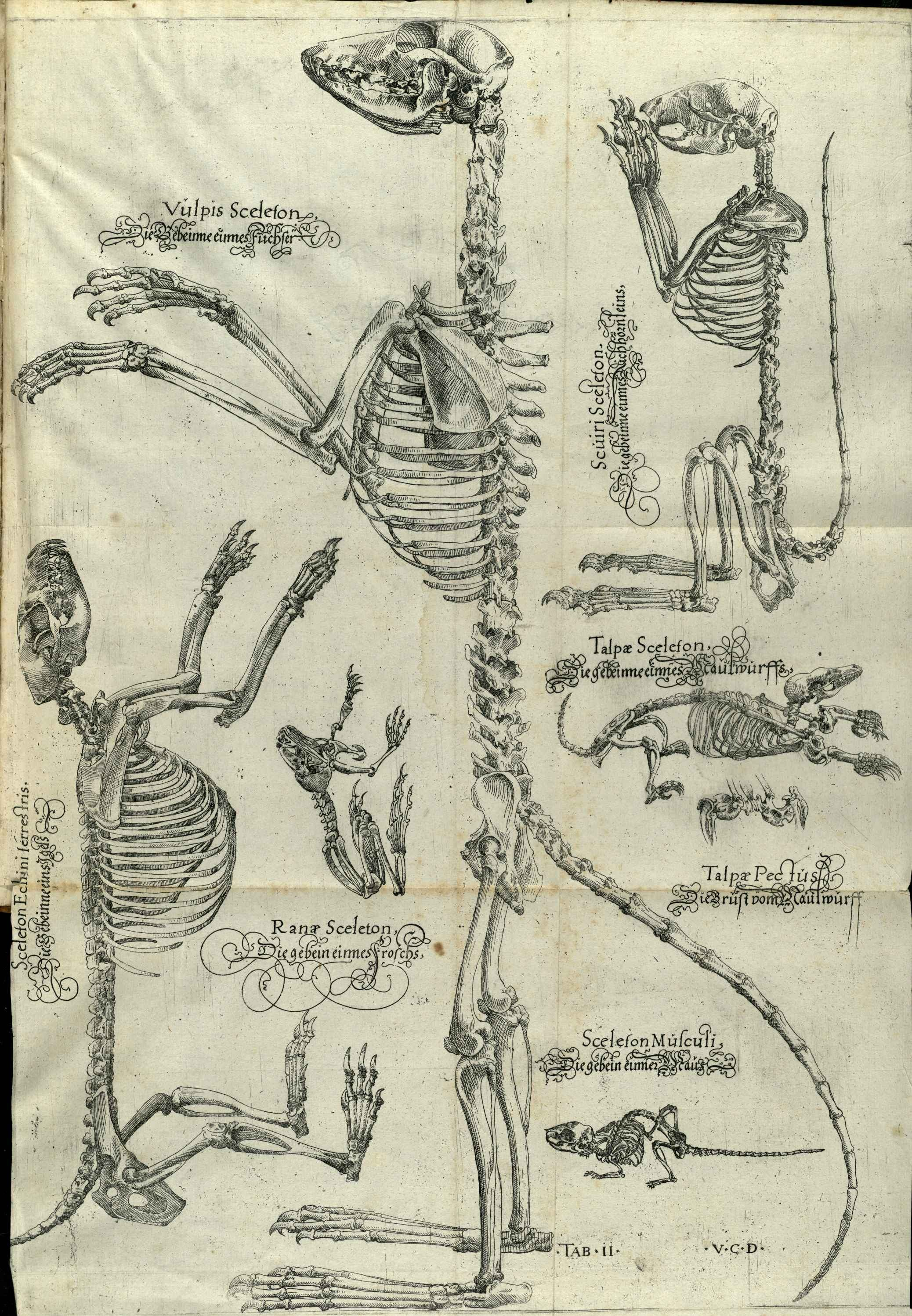
More quadrupeds

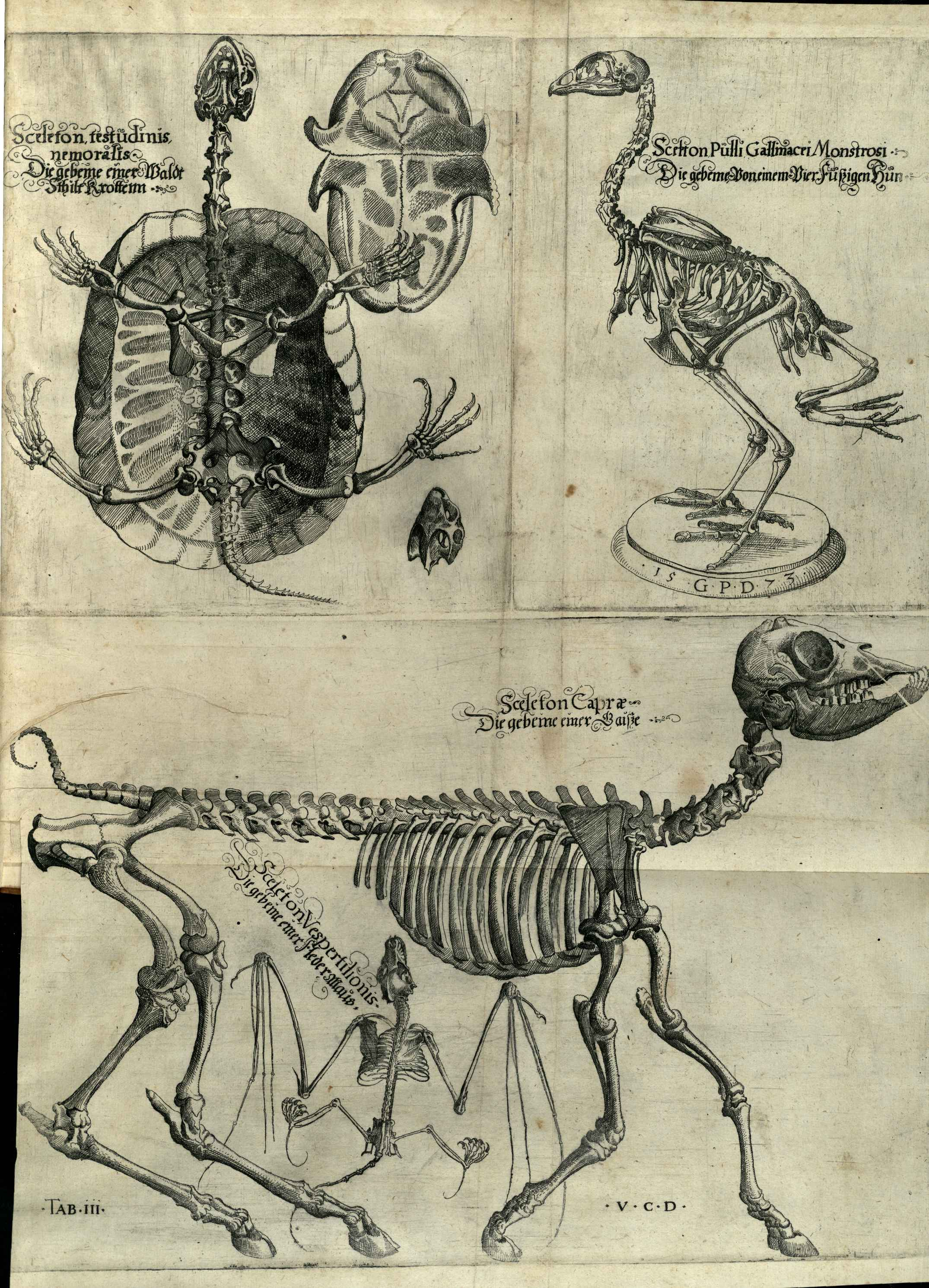
Skeletons of vertebrates including a freak chicken

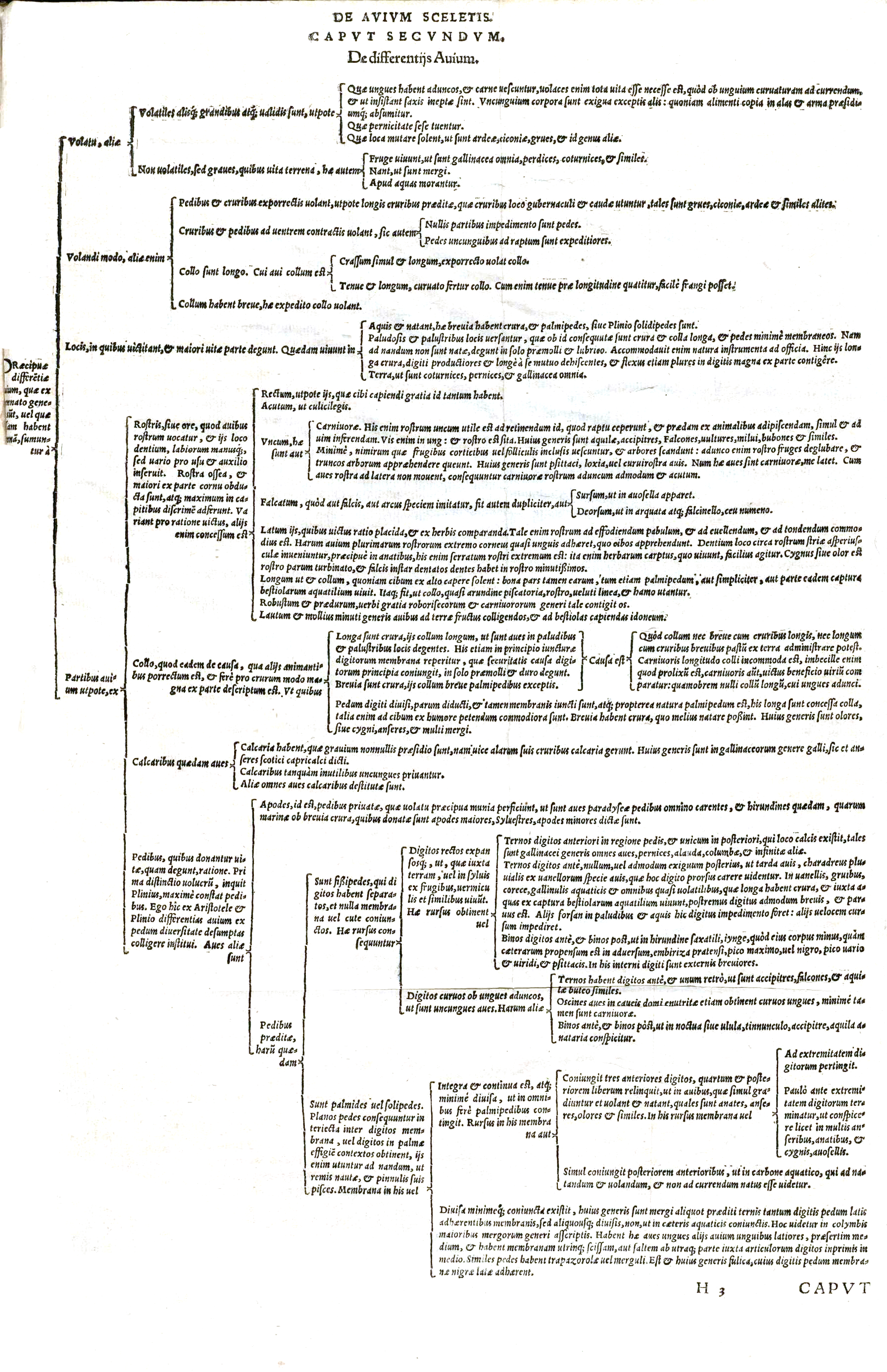
Classification by skeletal characters
