= Zwingerhaus =

Building in Basel, Switzerland

Coordinates: 47°33′28″N 7°35′08″E

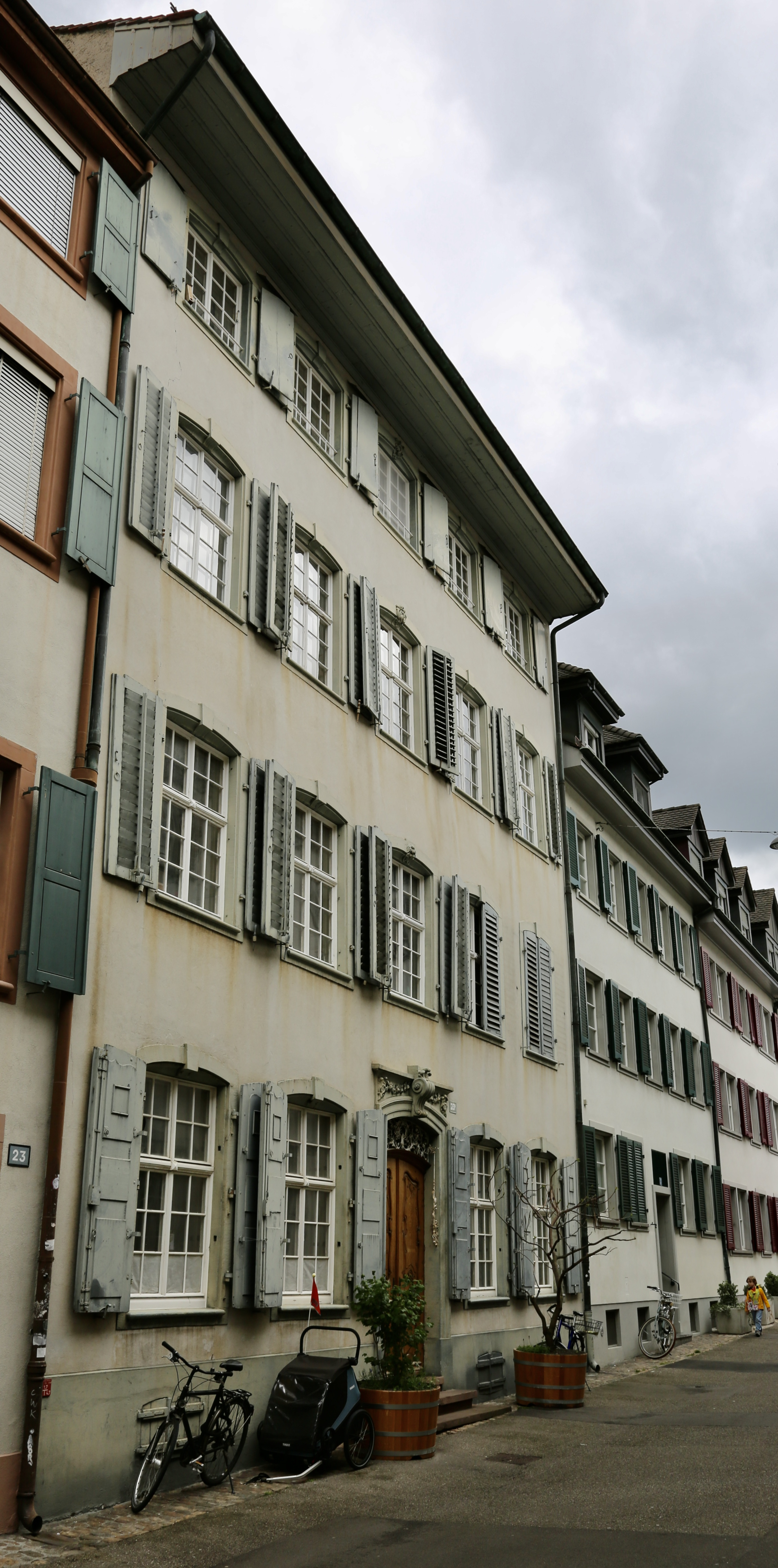
Zwingerhaus

The Zwingerhaus is located on Nadelberg 23a in Basel, Switzerland. It is named Zwingerhaus in memory of the physician Theodor Zwinger, who bought the house in 1572. It is first mentioned in 1345, then in possession of the family "zum Walpach", why it also called House zum Walpach or Walpachhaus. The house was and is located in one of the finest neighborhoods of Basel. In 1577 Theodor Zwinger called the Nadelberg a most noble and silent street. The Nadelberg translates into "Mountain of the Needle", and while the Nadelberg is not really a mountain the street follows the crest along the valley of the Birsig creek. In its neighborhood the well established families from Basel built their residences.

== History ==
In 1375 a house in possession of Heinrich Zum Walpach was first mentioned While in possession of the zum Walpach family, the garden of the Zwingerhaus reached the Pfeffergässlein (English:Pepperalley) at the bottom of the valley. Peterans von Walpach also owned two houses on the Nadelberg in the 14th century. In 1487 the house came into poession of Niklaus Rüsch, the then Communal Secretary of Basel and former Communal Secretary of Mülhausen. In 1494 Rüsch sold the house to Morand von Brunn and his wife Maria Zscheckenbürlein. In 1572 the house was purchased by Theodor Zwinger who renovated the house. Most prominently he added a stair tower to the building, which was one of the first ones of its kind in Basel. He was also planning to decorate the facade with a mural, for which Hans Bock the Elder The descentents of Zwinger lived in the house until 1686. The Zwinger family had also purchased two more houses in the neighborhood. In 1747 the estate was purchased by Niklaus Preiswerk. In 1843 the main house of the estate at the Nadelberg 23a was bought by the city of Basel.
