= Guillaume Rondelet =

French physician (1507–1566)

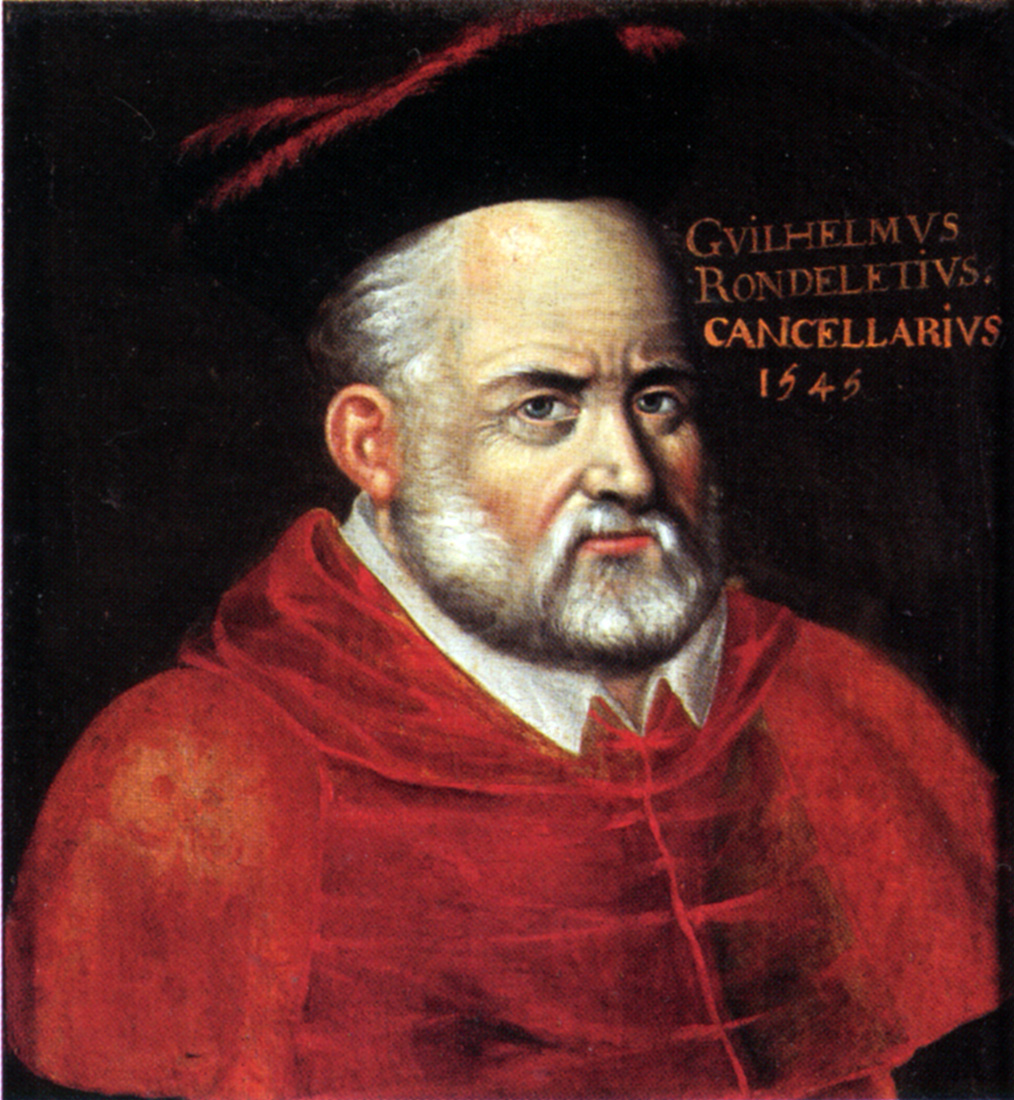
- Guillaume Rondelet in 1545
- Born: 27 September 1507; Montpellier, Kingdom of France
- Died: 30 July 1566 (aged 58); Réalmont, Kingdom of France
- Education: University of Paris
- Scientific career
- Fields: Anatomy; Botany; Medicine; Zoology
- Workplaces: University of Montpellier
- Academic advisors: Johann Winter von Andernach
- Doctoral students: Felix Plater
- Other notable students: Volcher Coiter
- Author abbrev. (botany): Rondelet

Guillaume Rondelet (27 September 1507 – 30 July 1566), also known as Rondeletus/Rondeletius, was Regius professor of medicine at the University of Montpellier in southern France and Chancellor of the University between 1556 and his death in 1566. He achieved renown as an anatomist and a naturalist with a particular interest in botany and ichthyology. His major work was a lengthy treatise on marine animals, which took two years to write and became a standard reference work for about a century afterwards, but his lasting impact lay in his education of a roster of star pupils who became leading figures in the world of late-16th century science.

== Early life and education ==
Rondelet was born in Montpellier in 1507. His father was an aromatarius, a combination of pharmacist, grocer and druggist. His father died while he was a child and he was brought up in the care of his elder brother. His health was poor until he reached the age of 18. He was educated in Montpellier and was sent to Paris in 1525, where he studied Latin and philosophy at the University of Paris.

He matriculated in 1529 and returned to Montpellier; having developed an interest in medicine, he joined the Faculty of Medicine at his home town's university. In 1530 he became procurator (Student Registrar). He became friends around this time with a fellow physician, François Rabelais, who later wrote La vie de Gargantua et Pantagruel in which Rondelet is satirised under the thinly disguised alias of "Rondibilis". While serving as procurator, Rondelet expelled the newly enrolled Nostradamus from the university for being an apothecary and slandering doctors.

Rondelet moved to Pertuis in the Vaucluse after gaining his bachelor's degree from Montpellier and tried to supplement his income by teaching local children, but met with little success. He went back to Paris to learn Greek and to study anatomy, again supporting himself through teaching. He practised for a while as a medical doctor at Maringues in the Auvergne before returning to Montpellier in 1537. There he finished his doctorate and married Jeanne Sandre the following year. The couple lived with Jeanne's sister Catherine for the next seven years.

His medical practice was not a success. He managed his finances badly and he outraged the citizens of Montpellier when he publicly dissected his infant son in an attempt to determine the cause of death. He became a teacher with the medical faculty in 1539 but the arrival of plague in Montpellier a few years later meant that he found himself with almost nobody to teach; only three students were left by 1543.

== Service with Cardinal de Tournon and work on marine zoology ==
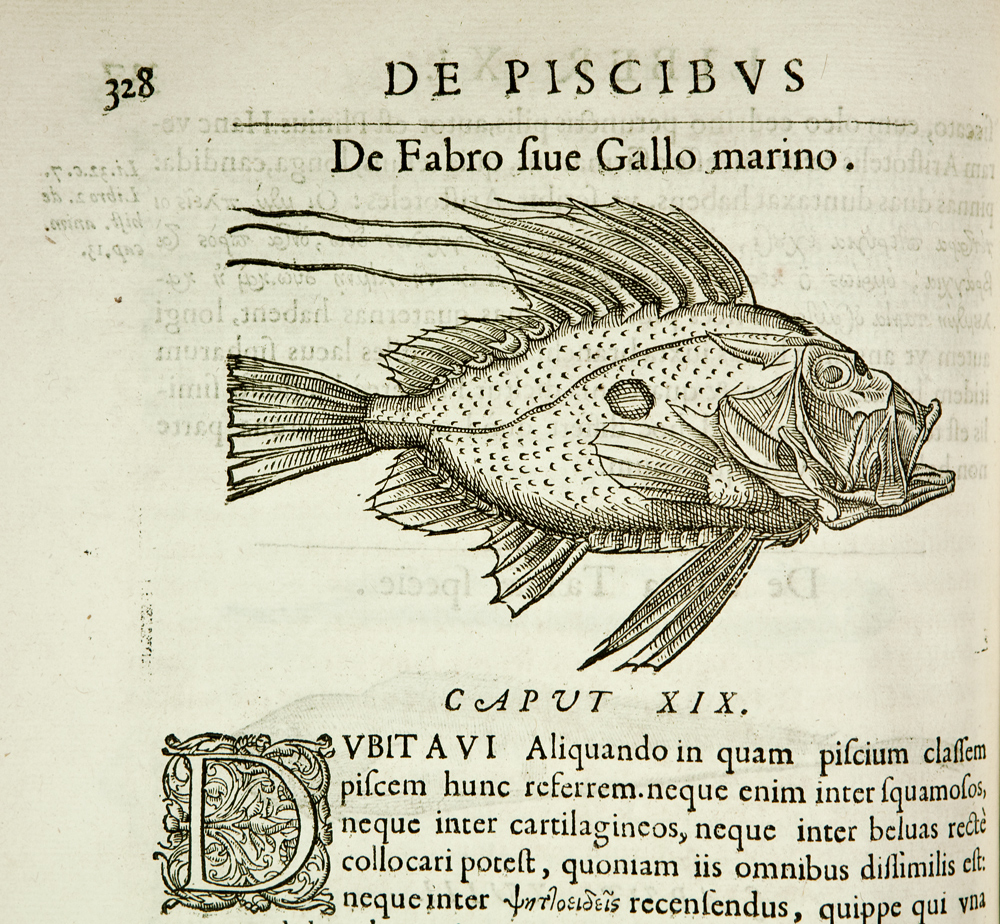
Extract from Rondelet's 1554 work De piscibus

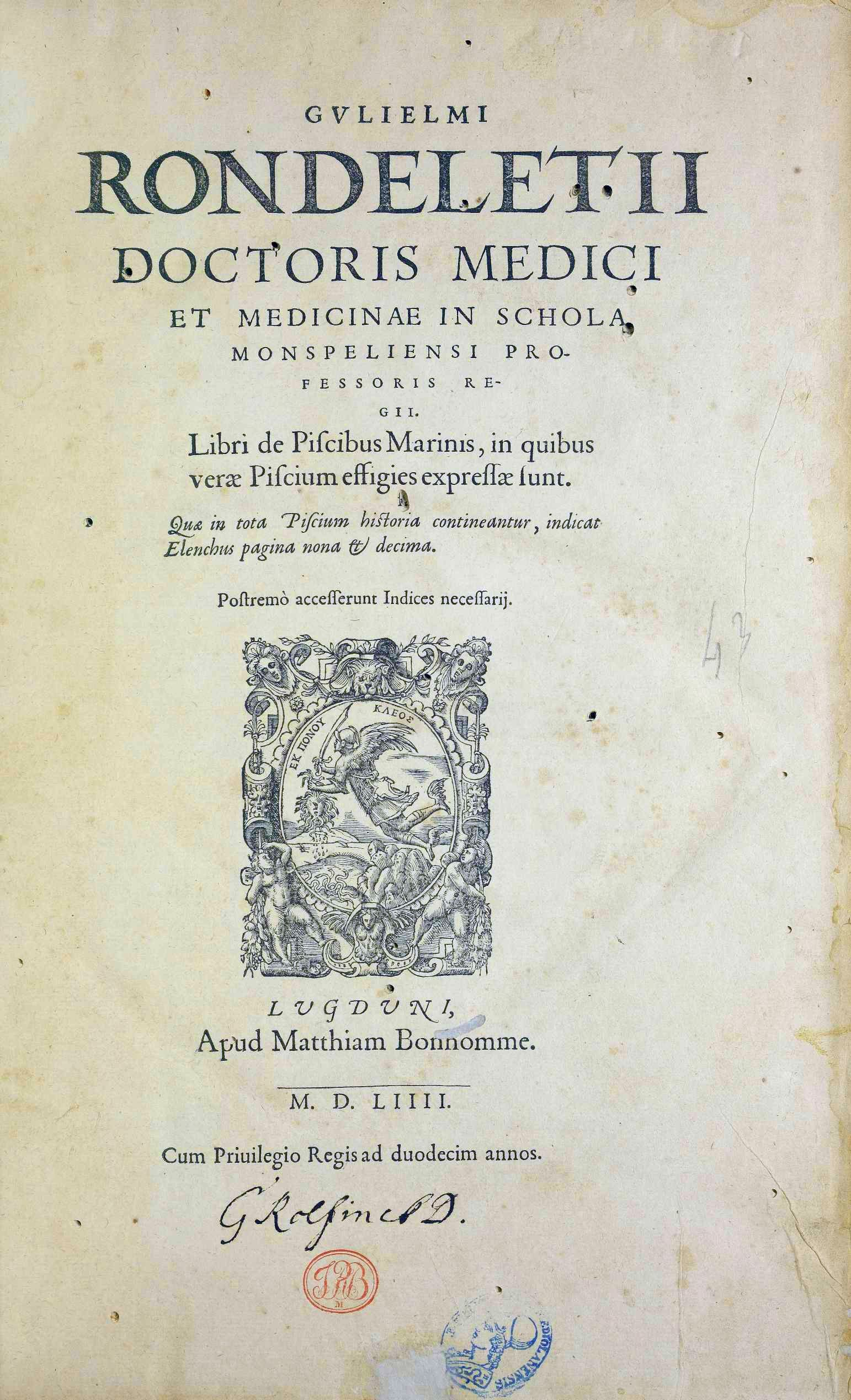
Libri de piscibus marinis, 1554

Rondelet's fortunes revived when he gained a powerful patron, Cardinal François de Tournon, whom he attended as his personal physician. De Tournon and the Bishop of Montpellier, Guillaume Pellicier, had both stood as sponsors for Rondelet's twin children on their birth in 1538. Rondelet left Montpellier and travelled with de Tournon in the Cardinal's entourage, journeying widely around France, what is now Belgium and Italy and stayed in Rome for thirteen months in 1549 and 1550. His trip to Italy enabled him to meet many of the Italian scholars whom he knew through his correspondence, among them Luca Ghini at Pisa, Antonio Musa Brasavola at Ferrara, Ulisse Aldrovandi and Cesare Odo at Bologna. While in Italy he was able to indulge his interest in natural history by visiting the coast.

His rising status was confirmed in 1545 by his appointment to the post of Regius Professor of Medicine at Montpellier. He returned to his home town in 1551 on leaving the service of the cardinal and devoted two years to the writing of a great treatise on marine animals, titled Libri de piscibus marinis in quibus verae piscium effigies expressae sunt. It took him two years to write and, despite the title's reference to piscibus (fish), it covered all aquatic animals; like others of his time, he made no distinction between fish, marine mammals such as seals and whales, crustaceans and other invertebrates. He also tackled the question of whether freshwater sea creatures could live in marine environments and vice versa.

His approach was broadly similar to that of Aristotle in that he focused on the functional aspects of a creature and examined why and how a particular feature or organ functioned. In the case of freshwater fish, for instance, he looked for and compared the swim bladders of freshwater and marine specimens. He dissected and illustrated numerous creatures; his anatomical drawing of a sea urchin is the earlier extant depiction of an invertebrate and he found important anatomical similarities between dolphins, pigs and humans. Published in 1554, the book was used as a standard reference work for many years afterwards and was translated into French in 1558 under the title L'histoire entière des poissons ("The complete history of fish").

== Teaching and notable students ==
Rondelet was a popular and effective teacher and lecturer and was elected chancellor of Montpellier University in 1556. Among his pupils were Charles de l'Écluse (Carolus Clusius), Matthias de l'Obel (Lobelius), Pierre Pena and Jacques Daléchamps. Rondelet also taught Jean Bauhin and Felix Platter, the latter arriving at Montpellier aged only 15 after riding a pony all the way from Basel in Switzerland. Under Rondelet's chancellorship, the university attracted students from across France and abroad and received sponsorship from the French crown; he persuaded King Henry II to fund the construction of an anatomy theatre in Montpellier.

However, the university suffered the effects of France's growing division between Catholics and Protestants that broke out into the French Wars of Religion in 1562. Many students came from Protestant areas of France, reflecting the Protestant sympathies of Rondelet's home region of Languedoc. They had been unable to study elsewhere in France where Catholics controlled the universities. Rondelet himself was drawn into the religious dispute when his friend Bishop Pellicier was imprisoned, prompting Rondelet to make a public protest by burning his own theology books. It is unclear whether Rondelet himself was a Protestant but he seems to have either converted to Protestantism late in his life or to have been generally interested in Protestant thought.

== Last days ==
In the summer of 1566 Rondelet visited Toulouse to assist some family members in some unknown business. As it was hot, and the hygienic conditions in the medieval city were rather poor, there was an outbreak of dysentery. By the end of July, Rondelet became infected too. That didn't stop him however from traveling to Réalmont (in the Tarn) with a friend of his, on a request to care for his sick wife there. Upon arrival, his condition grew worse. He died in Réalmont on 30 July.

== Works ==
- Libri de piscibus marinis in quibus verae piscium effigies expressae sunt. Mathias Bonhomme, Lyon, 1554. Digital edition of the Bibliothèque nationale de France.
- Gulielmi Rondeletii de ponderibus : sive de iusta quantitate et proportione medicamentorum liber. [S.l.]; Antverpiae : Plantin, 1561. Digital edition of the University and State Library Düsseldorf.
- Dispensatorium sev pharmacopolarum officina : adiecto indice copioso. Byrckmann, Köln 1565. Digital edition of the University and State Library Düsseldorf.

A genus of fish (Rondeletia) and a plant genus (Rondeletia) are both named for Rondelet.
