= Paleopathology in Switzerland =

Study of ancient diseases in Swiss archaeological remains

Paleopathology is a scientific discipline that examines skeletal and biological remains from archaeological excavations to study diseases and conditions in human and animal populations throughout history. Paleopathology in Switzerland remains underdeveloped compared to other countries, with no independent university discipline or established paleopathological school. Almost all Swiss paleopathologists have devoted only part of their research time to the field, working primarily in isolation. Nevertheless, early examples of paleopathological remarks exist, with Swiss studies potentially among the oldest in the field worldwide. Today, a small but active interdisciplinary community continues paleopathological research in Switzerland.

By examining pathological modifications of skeletons and other remains, researchers can identify injuries, infections, tumors, congenital malformations, deficiencies, metabolic diseases, and dental conditions. Combining paleopathological data with anthropological and archaeological information—such as age at death, sex, dating, burial location, and grave goods—allows reconstruction of not only individual medical histories but also the living conditions of population groups and epidemiological events. Investigation methods include examination of remains, imaging (radiography, computed tomography), tissue microscopy (histology), and molecular biology analyses, particularly ancient DNA analysis.

Significant bone collections exist in Switzerland, particularly in Basel, including the Galler Collection and skeletons from the cemetery of the former Saint-Jean hospital. Due to limited systematically collected data, epidemiological approaches to understanding disease patterns have been constrained compared to other regions.

== Early history and key individuals ==
Felix Platter (1536–1614) of Basel is credited as one of the first paleopathologists in the world. Working as a physician and one of the very first great anatomists of the early modern period, Platter was also a cofounder of forensic medicine and appointed professor of medicine at the University of Basel, the oldest Swiss university. In his famous Observationes—a treatise on every kind of disease—Platter described a peculiar case of gigantism in the third volume. In 1584, he analyzed an assemblage of large "old" bones from the Lucerne area that he and his contemporaries believed dated to an earlier epoch. Based on their enormous size, equivalent to nineteen feet tall, Platter concluded this was evidence of human gigantism. This reference is regarded as possibly the very first paleopathological comment in Switzerland.

Between the 16th century and the middle of the 19th century, no clear evidence of paleopathological research in Switzerland exists. During the second half of the 19th century and early 20th century, researchers such as Jakob Nüesch (1845–1915), Julius Kollmann (1834–1918), and Otto Schlaginhaufen (1879–1973) developed interest in anthropological questions concerning the origin of excavated individuals. At this time, craniometry and stature comparison were the main research topics. Kollmann, professor of anatomy at the University of Basel, particularly gained an international reputation, and under his direction the skull collection from Basel's Anatomical Institute became world-renowned.

Nüesch discovered the important Swiss archaeological site of Schweizersbild in 1891 in the canton of Schaffhausen, containing a Neolithic cemetery from the first half of the 4th millennium BC. He excavated and precisely documented twenty-two prehistoric graves. The famous German pathologist Rudolf Virchow visited this site and discovered the graves, and the finds attracted international attention.

Emil Bächler (1868–1950) of St. Gall excavated and analyzed several Paleolithic caves in Switzerland, including Wildkirchli, Wildenmannlisloch, and Drachenloch. He described bone pathology and potential human modifications of cave bear bones, making him an early Swiss researcher who described animal bone pathology.

Otto Schlaginhaufen, professor of anthropology at the University of Zurich from 1911 to 1951, conducted extensive osteometric analyses including studies of abnormally short skeletons from Neolithic sites at Egolzwil and Wauwil. He also studied traumatic lesions from the Hallstatt period and was a founding member of the Swiss Association of Anthropology in 1920. For over forty years he edited the Journal of the Swiss Association of Anthropology and Ethnology, where paleopathological papers are published.

Following World War II, an increasing number of Swiss researchers became interested in paleopathology. Erik Hug (1911–1991), professor of anthropology at the University of Geneva, conducted meticulous work analyzing skeletal remains from historically dated Swiss cemeteries. His work on Ulrich von Hutten confirmed skeletally that this famous humanist had suffered from syphilis. Hug was also a founding member and first scientific director of the Interkantonale Arbeitsgemeinschaft zur Betreuung Anthropologischer Funde (Interstate Anthropology Work Unit, IAG).

Siegfried Scheidegger (1903–1989), professor of pathology at the University of Basel, specialized in conditions such as syphilis and arthritis on skeletal remains. He was involved in founding the IAG in 1957 and an international symposium dedicated solely to paleopathology was held on the occasion of his 80th birthday in 1984 in Liestal.

Roland Bay (1909–1989), professor of dentistry at the University of Basel, developed a deep interest in dental paleopathology and anthropology. He was responsible for the Collection of Physical Anthropology at the Basel Natural History Museum and chairman of the Swiss Association of Anthropology.

Erwin Uehlinger (1899–1980) of Schaffhausen, head of the Institute of Pathology at the University of Zurich and dean of the Faculty of Medicine, pioneered the study of modern bone pathology. He first described the late primary infection of tuberculosis and his influence on bone pathology was so significant that a leading paleopathology textbook was dedicated to him. His work remains of importance for paleopathologists today.

== Traumatisms ==
Bone lesions provide information on accident risks from daily life and work, as well as violent acts. Fracture patterns in long bones distinguish themselves characteristically between sexes and across historical periods. In women, the clavicle, radius, and femoral neck are primarily affected, while men show additional fractures in the ulna, tibia, and fibula, reflecting gendered division of labor. Elderly women faced particular trauma risks from osteoporosis. During the Early Middle Ages, approximately 1% of all long bones studied showed consolidated fractures; this proportion generally decreased toward contemporary periods, though disparities between burial groups and social classes intensified. Individuals from lower classes showed significantly more broken bones, likely due to riskier daily tasks, as excavations at cemeteries in Berne and the forced labor facility of Realta demonstrate.

Violence is attested from the Neolithic onward. At Seeberg (Lake Burgäschi), in the early 4th millennium BC, a man succumbed to at least one blunt head trauma. Cranial traumatisms appear in multiple individuals from Iron Age burials. Numerous traumatic lesions have been found in contexts interpreted as Celtic sanctuaries and victory monuments (Le Mormont, La Tène), though debate continues whether these were inflicted post-mortem or represent war trophies or human sacrifice victims.

During the Early Middle Ages, traumatisms—primarily healed sword wounds—are attested on 5 to 10% of male skulls from excavated necropoli, indicating that violence between men was widespread but rarely fatal. Late medieval and early modern wars show different wound types reflecting changing warfare methods. Skulls of victims of the 1499 Battle of Dornach show multiple serious lesions caused by swords and halberds, with smaller proportions of blunt impacts and pointed weapon injuries. Coalition War soldiers (1799–1800) suffered numerous bayonet and bullet wounds.

Comparison of traumatisms with historically recorded events is sometimes possible. Wounds on the skull of Jörg Jenatsch, exhumed in Chur Cathedral, confirm written sources stating his murderer killed him from behind with an axe in 1639. Excavations of former gallows sites reveal lethal injuries characteristic of decapitation, testifying to medieval and early modern criminal justice.

== Infectious diseases ==
Infectious diseases such as osteomyelitis, tuberculosis, syphilis, and leprosy can leave skeletal traces recognizable at macroscopic level, enabling differential diagnosis. Through paleogenetics, pathogenic agents can now be detected in human remains. Osteomyelitis appears sporadically but regularly throughout Switzerland from the Neolithic to the modern period, typically associated with Staphylococcus aureus, identified on a femur from the Neolithic dolmen of Oberbipp (around 3000 BC).

Tuberculosis appears to have been present but isolated during prehistory and protohistory, with its spread dating to approximately 2000 years ago. The oldest confirmed cases in Switzerland date to the 7th century at Courroux, with other examples from the early and central Middle Ages at Oberwil bei Büren, Walkringen, and Leontica. Although primarily a pulmonary disease, tuberculosis extends to the skeleton in 1–5% of cases, typically damaging the spine or major joints. In the modern period, tuberculosis reached epidemic proportions, especially among poor populations, as shown by anthropological analyses from burial sites and cemeteries of forced labor institutions.

Syphilis, a sexually transmitted disease manifesting skeletally at the tertiary stage, spread as an epidemic across Europe from the late 15th century onward. Among the dead from the Battle of Dornach, two were probably infected, indicating that mercenary armies' mobility contributed to disease spread. Other cases have been identified at multiple Swiss sites, including congenital syphilis cases transmitted to children by infected mothers.

Following the devastating 14th-century epidemic, plague became endemic in Europe with recurrent outbreaks over subsequent centuries. Although plague leaves no visible marks on bone, the pathogenic agent can be detected in human remains through molecular biology. Mass graves or simultaneous multiple burials at Swiss sites such as Zweisimmen, Stans, and Ems indicate epidemic events; paleogenetics revealed early modern plague pathogens phylogenetically similar to samples from the Thirty Years' War period.

Bacterial and viral pathogens can be identified in archaeological remains through paleogenetic analyses. Researchers isolated Salmonella enterica Paratyphi genomes from the Neolithic dolmen of Oberbipp, a human-specific bacterium today causing paratyphoid or typhoid. Detection of viruses in archaeological skeletons remains in early stages, though a hepatitis B virus strain was identified in bones from the medieval multiple burial of Zweisimmen.

== Deficiency diseases and developmental disorders ==
In regions such as the Alpine area where natural iodine concentration is low, populations suffer from a spectrum of deficiency disorders without supplementation. Cooking salt was iodized from the 1920s in Switzerland, contributing to the near-total disappearance of iodine deficiency symptoms. Children born to mothers with severe iodine deficiency could develop cretinism, recognizable in bone as mental deficiency along with growth and skeletal development delays. Most known cases are from institutional cemeteries such as Riggisberg and Realta, as individuals with cretinism were often placed in institutions.

Scurvy (vitamin C deficiency) is rarely identified in adult skeletons. Its frequency among inmates at Realta illuminates the living conditions and nutritional state of marginalized persons. In children, scurvy is more apparent skeletally, developing as Moeller-Barlow syndrome after brief vitamin C deficiency. Affected infants are attested in the Roman period and Early Middle Ages at multiple Swiss sites.

Vitamin D deficiency in infants and children causes rickets—incomplete bone mineralization during growth, leading to permanent deformation of weight-bearing long bones. The primary cause is insufficient sun exposure. Rickets spread in industrialization's wake, particularly in cities, and is notably attested at Basel - Spitalfriedhof. Gout is documented in isolated cases, favored by a combination of purine-rich diet and genetic predisposition.

Congenital bone malformations and developmental disorders such as growth delays, vertebral deformations (scolioses), and cancers are rare in paleopathology but attested across all periods at various Swiss sites. The unusual prevalence of severe scoliosis cases in the modern-period cemetery of Berne - Holzwerkhof suggests possible kinship links among buried individuals.

== Dental diseases and medical interventions ==
Dental caries intensity, low until the Middle Ages, increased continuously toward the present. During the same period, dental crown abrasion—previously significant—declined following the introduction of cylinder mills replacing stone mills in the 19th century, reducing abrasive particles in flour but eliminating a form of natural tooth cleaning. In the 18th century, new caries-promoting foods, including potato, corn, and refined sugar, supplemented the diet. Without antibiotics, massive caries could easily cause death by sepsis, as probably occurred in a young man buried at Bienne - Mâche in the Early Middle Ages, whose rotted teeth caused a cyst in the upper jaw. Tooth preservation measures such as metal fillings or prostheses appear regularly only from the 19th century onward.

Trepanation—intentional opening of the cranial vault with skull piece removal for therapeutic or ritual purposes—was probably often undertaken following cranial traumatisms. In Switzerland, over thirty cases are known from the Neolithic through the 19th century of trephined individuals, most of whom survived the operation. The majority of discoveries date to the Neolithic, followed by the late Iron Age.

Limb amputations, attested in Switzerland since the Early Middle Ages, were probably most often performed following traumatisms by barber-surgeons. The oldest known surviving case was discovered in the Early Medieval cemetery of Bonaduz: an amputee of the right foot wore a prosthesis, part of which was found in the tomb. Two Cluniac monks from Île Saint-Pierre who survived amputation lost their feet (11th–15th centuries), possibly due to gout or diabetes. Numerous limb removals are documented for the 19th century. In many early modern-period cemeteries, possible amputation remains were uncovered, along with human body parts including sawed skulls, likely remnants of anatomical examinations.

== Institutions and publications ==
- Swiss Association of Anthropology (SGA) was founded in Basel in 1920, mainly through the work of Otto Schlaginhaufen, Karl Friedrich Sarasin, and Eugène Pittard. The Association serves as a joint Swiss unit for several disciplines including anthropology, paleopathology, historical anthropology, and forensic anthropology, and publishes a journal where paleopathological research appears.
- Interkantonale Arbeitsgemeinschaft zur Betreuung Anthropologischer Funde (Intercantonal Anthropology Working Group, IAG) was founded in 1957 with the intention of facilitating analysis of skeletal remains from Swiss cemetery excavations. The IAG plays an important role in paleopathological research today by providing professional physical anthropological services for the whole of Switzerland. It currently curates a large collection of human remains and maintains a distinguished library of approximately 20,000 anthropological and paleopathological books.
- Arbeitsgemeinschaft für Historische Anthropologie der Schweiz (Swiss Historical Anthropology Working Group) was founded in 1986 to promote paleopathological and anthropological research in Switzerland by providing a platform for research projects and organizing annual meetings.
- Arbeitsgruppe für klinische Paläopathologie (Clinical Paleopathology Working Group) was founded in 1993 at the Institute of Medical History and Orthopedic University Hospital of Zurich. Since 2010 it has been incorporated in the Centre of Evolutionary Medicine at the University of Zurich. The team serves as a reference center for paleopathology, especially for Swiss human remains, and organizes courses twice annually in collaboration with universities in Basel, and Mainz (Germany), providing education and research insights.
- Swiss Mummy Project, focusing on noninvasive diagnostic imaging of ancient mummified remains, was founded in 1995.
- Bulletin der Schweizer Gesellschaft für Anthropologie (Journal of the Swiss Association of Anthropology), first published in 1924–1925, is under peer review with an international scientific board and is the only full journal dealing solely with Swiss anthropology. Since 1995 nearly every issue includes at least one paleopathological paper.

== Skeletal collections ==
The Galler Collection, named after anatomy preparator Ernst Galler (1895–1957), consists of more than 1,500 clinical human dry pathological bones. Based partially on pathological series collected by Johann Lukas Schönlein, the first professor of medicine at the University of Zurich, Galler transformed a clinical pathological series into Switzerland's most important skeletal reference series. The collection contains mostly human remains from the mid-20th century with known medical histories or autopsy reports, making it highly valued for evidence-driven comparative paleopathological research. Today the collection is divided between the Natural History Museum of Basel, the Institute of Anatomy in Zurich, and the Institute for the History of Medicine in Zurich.

The IAG collection, established in 1957 in Aesch, comprises nearly 60,000 human bones of Swiss origin from the Neolithic period to modern times, of which approximately 30 percent remains unpublished. The vast majority dates to the medieval period. The collection also includes approximately one million animal bones from across all time periods in Switzerland.

The Collection of Physical Anthropology at the Natural History Museum of Basel goes back to the early 19th century when anatomist Carl Gustav Jung began collecting bones. Over time the collection incorporated multiple smaller skeletal collections and today comprises approximately 10,000 examples. Especially important is the recently incorporated collection from Spitalfriedhof St. Johann, a former cemetery of Basel's City Hospital (1845–1868) excavated 1988–1989, consisting of about 221 individuals with special pathological lesions and available medical histories.

The Natural History Museum of Bern holds a small but steadily growing skeletal collection that began in 1866 under Christian Aeby, professor of anatomy at the University of Bern. The collection grew thanks to Teophil Studer, professor of zoology at the Veterinary Medical School, who had special interest in Swiss Neolithic remains. Today the collection increases steadily as all newly excavated human skeletal remains from archaeological sites in the Bern district are analyzed and curated there.

== Bibliography ==
- Etter, Hansueli; Bockmühl, Petra et al.: Armut, Krankheit, Tod im frühindustriellen Basel. Der Spitalfriedhof St. Johann in Basel. Funde und Befunde aus einer anthropologischen Ausgrabung, 1993.
- Lanz, Christian: "Ein Skelett aus dem 15./16. Jahrhundert aus der ehemaligen Spitalkirche in Burgdorf, Kanton Bern: Ein Fall von tertiärer Syphilis?", in: Bulletin de la Société suisse d'anthropologie, 3/2, 1997, pp. 67–86.
- Dietrich, Eduard; Kaenel, Gilbert et al.: "Le sanctuaire helvète du Mormont", in: Archéologie suisse, 30/1, 2007, pp. 2–13.
- Ulrich-Bochsler, Susi: "Kranke, Behinderte und Gebrechliche im Spiegel der Skelettreste aus mittelalterlichen Dörfern, Kirchen und Klöstern (Bern/Schweiz)", in: Nolte, Cordula (ed.): Homo debilis. Behinderte – Kranke – Versehrte in der Gesellschaft des Mittelalters, 2009, pp. 183–202.
- Papageorgopoulou, Christina; Staub, Kaspar; Rühli, Frank: "Hypothyroidism in Switzerland from an anthropological, clinical and historic perspective", in: Harbeck, Michaela (ed.): Sickness, Hunger, War, and Religion. Multidisciplinary Perspectives, 2012, pp. 75–90.
- Hossein Moghaddam Horri, Negahnaz; Mailler-Burch, Simone et al.: "Survival after trepanation – early cranial surgery from late iron age Switzerland", in: International Journal of Paleopathology, 2015/11, pp. 56–65.
- Milella, Marco; Zollikofer, Christoph P.E.; Ponce de León, Marcia S.: "A neolithic case of mesomelic dysplasia from northern Switzerland", in: International Journal of Osteoarchaeology, 25, 2015, pp. 981–987.
- Cooper, Christine; Fellner, Robert et al.: "Tuberculosis in early medieval Switzerland – osteological and molecular evidence", in: Swiss Medical Weekly, 146, 2016.
- Ulrich-Bochsler, Susi; Cooper, Christine; Baeriswyl, Armand: "Karies, Knochenbrüche, Infektionen. Zwei Stadtberner Friedhöfe des 18. Jahrhunderts als anthropologische Quelle", in: Berner Zeitschrift für Geschichte, 78/4, 2016, pp. 3–39.
- Somers, Joke; Cooper, Christine et al.: "A medieval/early modern alpine population from Zweisimmen, Switzerland. A comparative study of anthropology and palaeopathology", in: International Journal of Osteoarchaeology, 27, 2017, pp. 958–972.
- Cooper, Christine; Heinzle, Bernd; Reitmaier, Thomas: "Evidence of infectious disease, trauma, disability and deficiency in skeletons from the 19th/20th century correctional facility and asylum "Realta" in Cazis, Switzerland", in: Plos One, 14/5, 2019.
- Lösch, Sandra; Lassau, Guido; Reitmaier, Thomas: "Nur 100 Jahre alt? Historische Friedhöfe zwischen Ignoranz, Akzeptanz und Relevanz", in: Archéologie suisse, 42/4, 2019, pp. 4–15.
- Spyrou, Maria A.; Keller, Marcel et al.: "Phylogeography of the second plague pandemic revealed through analysis of historical Yersinia pestis genomes", in: Nature Communications, 10, 2019.
- Key, Felix M.; Posth, Cosimo et al.: "Emergence of human-adapted Salmonella enterica is linked to the neolithization process", in: Nature Ecology & Evolution, 4, 2020, pp. 324–333.
- Seifert, Mathias; Cooper, Christine et al.: "Der Pestfriedhof des 17. Jahrhunderts", in: Burkhardt, Lorena (ed.): Domat/Ems, Sogn Pieder. Vom frühmittelalterlichen Herrenhof zum neuzeitlichen Pestfriedhof, 2020, pp. 241–259.
- Debard, Julie; Dutour, Olivier et al.: "A unique case of skeletal dysplasia in an adult male in late iron age Switzerland", in: International Journal of Paleopathology, 2021/34, pp. 29–36.
- Kocher, Arthur; Papac, Luka et al.: "Ten millennia of hepatitis B virus evolution", in: Science, 374/6564, 2021, pp. 182–188.
- Laffranchi, Zita; Milella, Marco et al.: "Co-occurrence of malignant neoplasm and Hyperostosis Frontalis Interna in an iron age individual from Münsingen-Rain (Switzerland). A multi-diagnostic study", in: International Journal of Paleopathology, 2021/32, pp. 1–8.
- Perréard Lopreno, Geneviève; Thorimbert, Sophie: "Les cimetières récents en Suisse occidentale: vers une reconnaissance des enjeux scientifiques", in: Archéologie suisse, 44/3, 2021, pp. 4–15.
- Lösch, Sandra; Gerling, Claudia et al.: "Anthropologische und biochemische Untersuchung der neolithischen Menschenknochen um den Burgäschisee", in: Hafner, Albert; Hostettler, Marco (ed.): Burgäschisee 5000-3000 v.Chr. Siedlungsdynamik und Mobilität, Landnutzung und Subsistenz, 2022, pp. 327–339.
