= Thomas Platter the Younger =

Swiss physician and writer

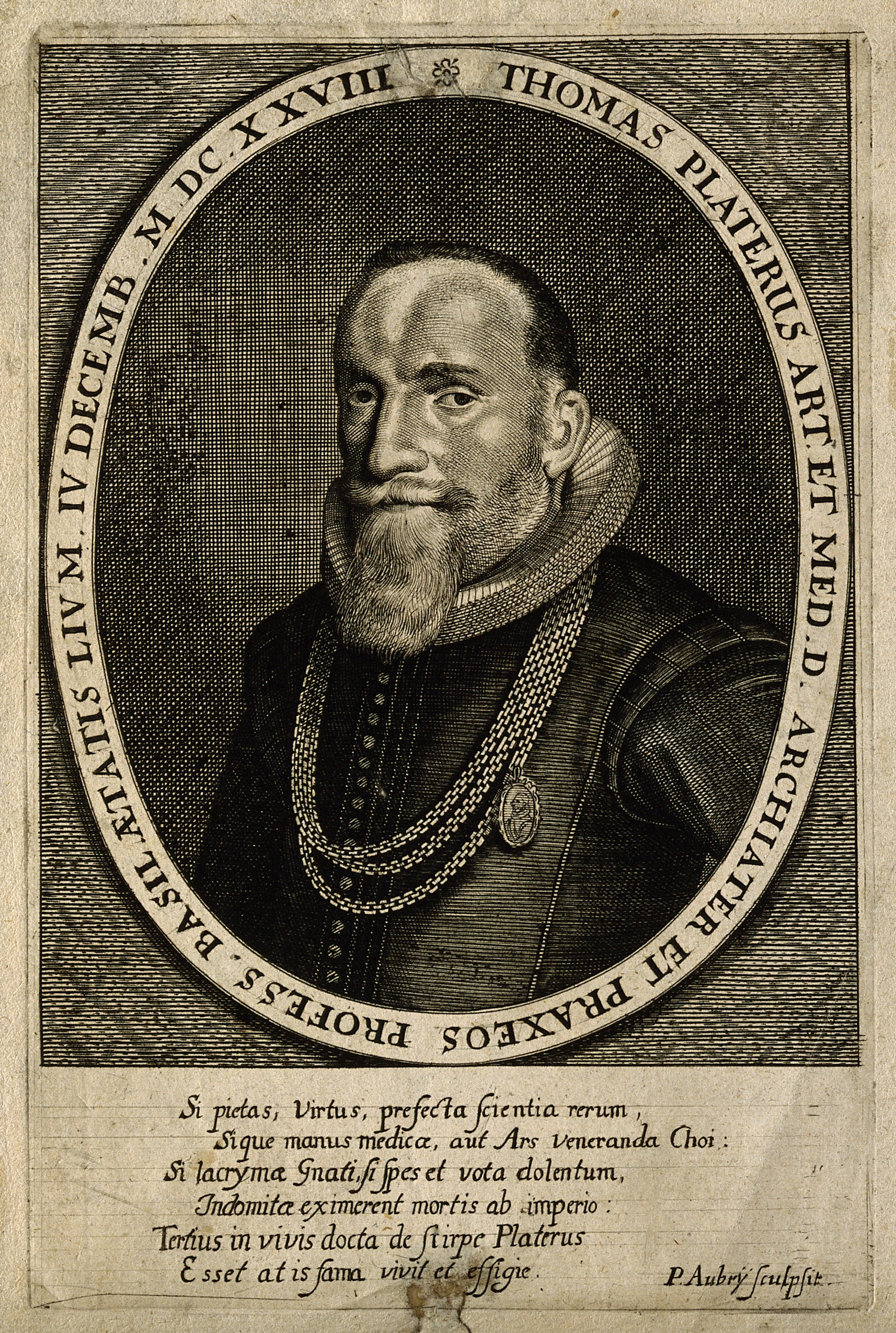
Thomas Platter the Younger

Thomas Platter the Younger (/ˈplɑːtər/; German: [ˈplatɐ]; c. 24 July 1574 in Basel – 4 December 1628 in Basel) was a Swiss-born physician, traveller, and diarist, the son of the humanist Thomas Platter the Elder. He was a professor of anatomy, botany, and medicine at the University of Basel, as well as the city physician for Basel.

Platter kept a diary from 1595 to 1600. Platter recounts his life as a medical student in Montpellier and his travels in France, Spain, Flanders, and England. He describes many aspects of late sixteenth-century European culture: medical education (including dissections), street and carnival life in Barcelona, European theater, and the slave trade.

On 21 September 1599, "at about two o'clock," Platter and his older half-brother Felix Platter saw an early production of Julius Caesar at the Globe Theatre in London. Platter's account provides Shakespeare scholars with evidence for the dating of that play.

== Bibliography ==
- Ladurie, Emmanuel Le Roy; Liechtenhan, Francine-Dominique (2000). Le voyage de Thomas Platter 1595-1599. (Le siècle des Platters II). Paris: Fayard. ISBN 2213605475.
- Ladurie, Emmanuel Le Roy; Liechtenhan, Francine-Dominique (2006). L'Europe de Thomas Platter: France, Angleterre, Pays-Bas 1599-1600. (Le siècle des Platters III). Paris: Fayard. ISBN 2213627851.
- Platter, Thomas (1968). Rut Keiser (ed.). Beschreibung der Reisen durch Frankreich, Spanien, England und die Niederlande (1595-1600). Basel, Stuttgart: Schwabe. ISBN 3796502067.
- Platter, Thomas (1963). Journal of a Younger Brother: the Life of Thomas Platter as a Medical Student in Montpellier at the Close of the Sixteenth Century. Translated by Seán Jennett. London: Frederick Muller.
- Platter, Thomas (1995). Razzell, Peter (ed.). The Journals of Two Travellers in Elizabethan and early Stuart England: Thomas Platter and Horatio Busino. London: Caliban. ISBN 185066014X.
- Platter, Thomas (1937). Thomas Platter's Travels in England, 1599. Translated by Clare Williams. London: Jonathan Cape.
