= Regnerus Praedinius =

Dutch humanist, rector and teacher

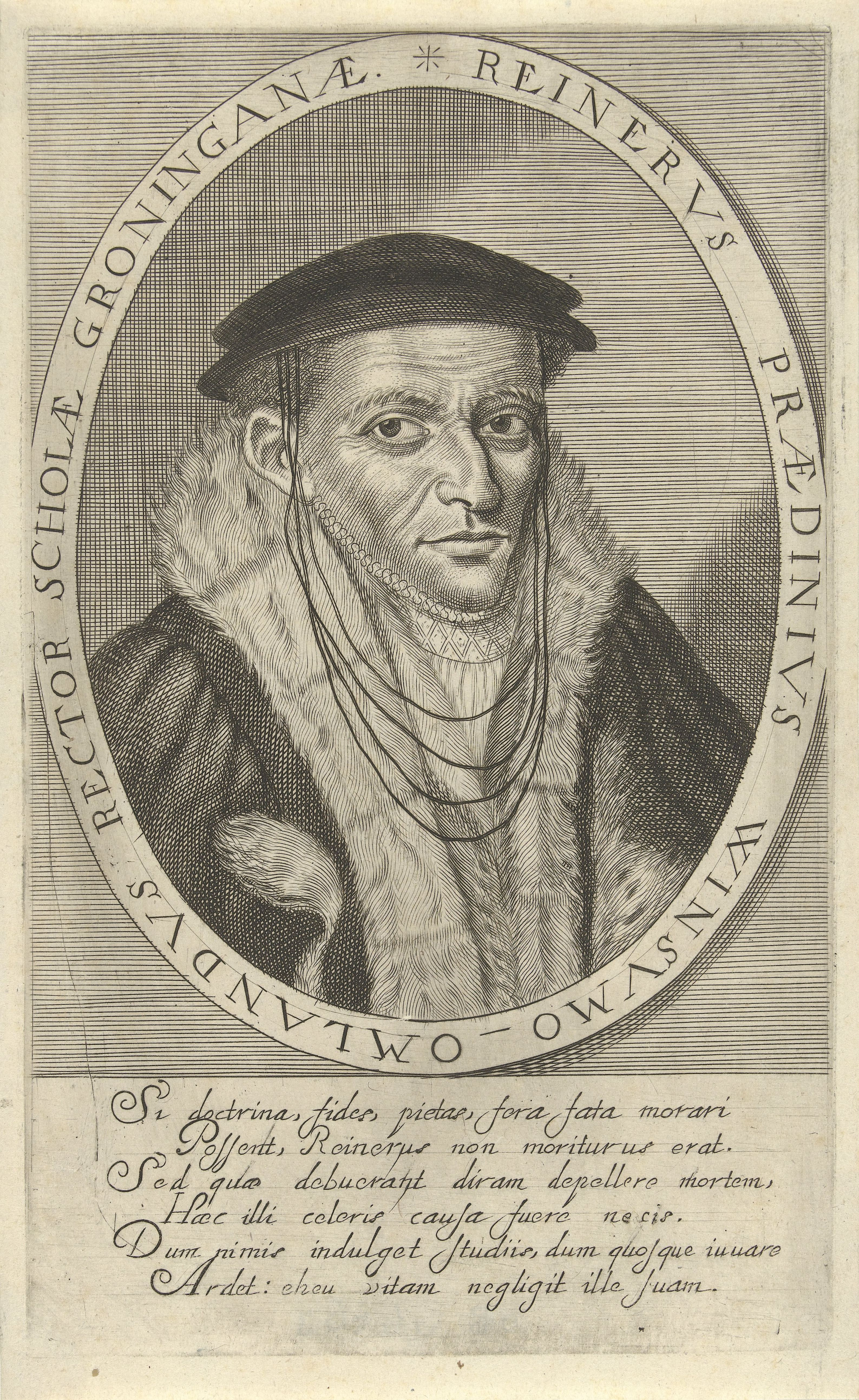

Regnerus Praedinius or Reinier Veldman (1510 – 1559) was a Dutch humanist, rector, reformer, and teacher. The Praedinius Gymnasium in Groningen is named after him. Johannes Acronius Frisius, Volcher Coiter, and Abel Eppens were among his students. He was born in Winsum as Reinier Veldman. He studied theology at the Fraterhuis in Groningen, and at Leuven, before becoming the rector of the St. Maartens school. He began to find problems in the Catholic Church and sought to reform the system. He was an admirer of Desiderius Erasmus. He later Latinized "Veldman" (or field man) using the word praedium to Praedinius. Reinier was likewise altered through the word "regnare" (to govern) to Regnerus.

Praedinius died in Groningen and is buried at the Martinikerkhof cemetery. In 1947 the town of Groningen renamed St. Martin's Gymnasium to Praedinius Gymnasium.
