= Conrad Lycosthenes =

Alsatian humanist and encyclopedist

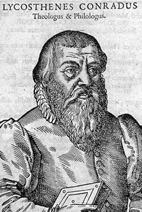
Conrad Lycosthenes

Conrad Lycosthenes (8 August 1518 – 25 March 1561), born Conrad Wolffhart, was an Alsatian humanist and encyclopedist. Deacon of Saint Leonard in Basel, professor of grammar and dialectics, Lycosthenes had a passion for the study of nature and geophysics.

== Life ==
Conrad Wolffhart was born in Rouffach in Alsace on 8 August 1518, the son of Theobald Wolffhart and Elizabeth Kürsner, sister of the Protestant theologian Conrad Pellicanus. He later changed his German name, Wolffhart, to the humanist name Lycosthenes.

From 1535 to 1539, Conrad studied philosophy in Heidelberg. In 1542, he left Heidelberg for Basel where he began teaching Grammar and Dialectics. In 1545, at the age of 27, he became Deacon in the Church of Saint-Leonard. On 21 December 1554, he suffered from hemiplegia and lost the ability to use his right hand. He learned to write with his left hand and continued his literary works until his death from apoplexia on 25 March 1561 at the age of 43. In the meantime he had married Chretienne Herbster, sister of the famous Basel book printer Johannes Oporinus (Oporin) and widow of Leonard Zwinger, father of Theodor Zwinger, author of the Theatrum vitae humanae.

== Works ==
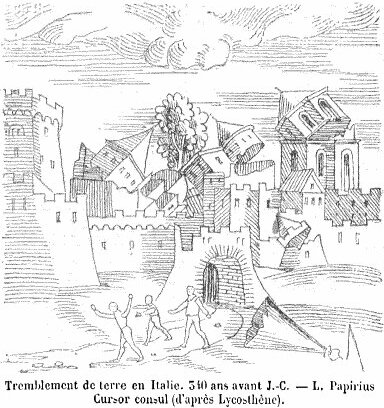
19th century reproduction of a plate from Prodigiorum ac ostentorum chronicon

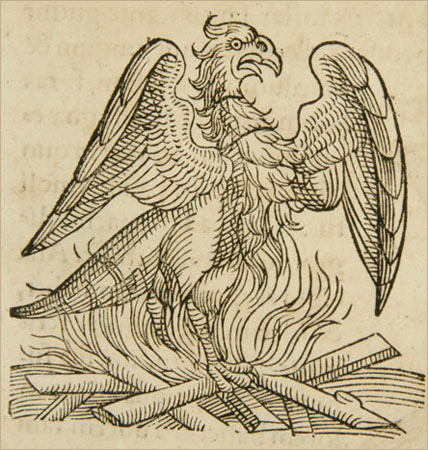
A phoenix from Apophthegmata

One of the numerous polyhistors of the 16th century, Lycosthenes mastered Latin and Greek, and was particularly fond of curiosities. His varied works include editions, translations, and compilations.

- 1547 Commentaries on De viris illustribus, Basel, in-8°.
- 1551 Elenchus scriptorum omnium, Basel, in-4°.
- 1551 Gnomologia ex AEneae Sylvii operibus collecta, Basel, edit.1555, in 4°.
- 1552 Iulii Obsequentis Prodigiorum liber, ab urbe condita usque ad Augustum Caesarem, cujus tantum extabat Fragmentum, nunc demum Historiarum beneficio, per Conradum Lycosthenem Rubeaquensem, integritati suae restitutus. Basileae, ex off. Ioannis Oporinii, Anno Salutis humanae, M.D.LII. Mense Martio, in-8°.
- 1552 J. Ravisii Textoris officina, Basel.
- 1555 Apophthegmatum sive responsorum memorabilium, ex probatissimis quibusque tam graecis quam latinis auctoribus priscis pariter atque recentioribus, collectorum Loci communes ad ordinem alphabeticum redacti, Basel, in fol.
- 1557 Epitome Stobaei Sententiarum, Basel, in -8°.
- 1557 Parabolae sive similitudines ex var. auct. ab Erasmo collectae, in locos communes redactae, Berne in-4°; Basel, 1575, 1602, in-8°.
- 1557 Prodigiorum ac ostentorum chronicon, quae praeter naturae ordinem, et in superioribus et his inferioribus mundi regionibus, ab exordio mundi usque ad haec nostra tempora acciderunt. Basileae per H. Petri, fol, 672 p. fig. et pl. (64).
- 1559 Dom. Brusonii Facetiarum lib. VII, Basel, in-4°.
- 1560 Regula investigationis omnium locorum in tabula Helvetiae contentorum, Basel, in-4°.
