= Lawrence Beyerlinck =

Belgian theologian

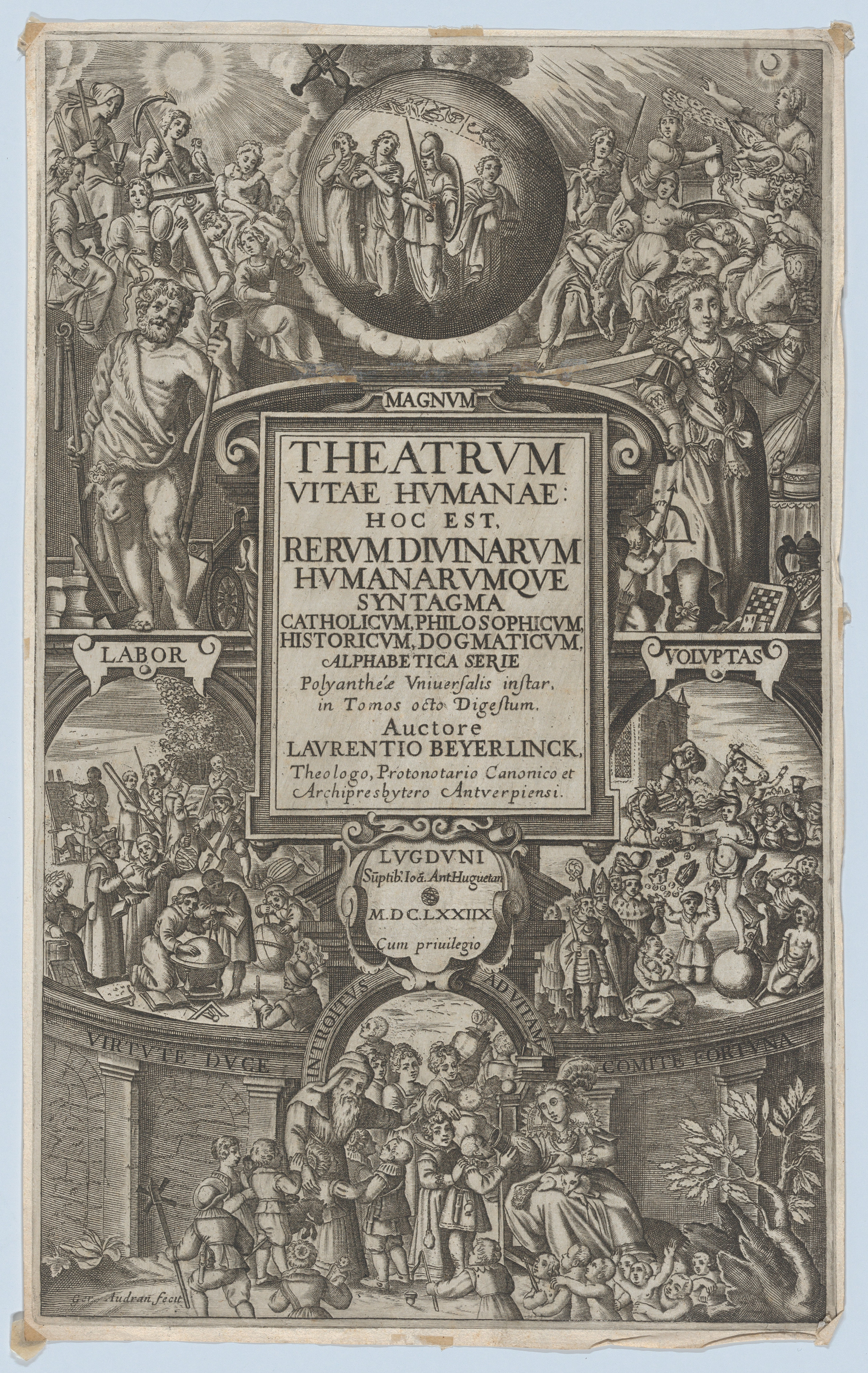
Frontispiece for Theatrum Vitae Humanae, Lyon, 1678

Lawrence Beyerlinck (April 1578, Antwerp – 22 June 1627, Antwerp) was a Belgian theologian and ecclesiastical writer and encyclopedist.

== Life ==
The son of a pharmacist, he prepared at Leuven for the same profession but, deciding to enter the priesthood, he was ordained June, 1602. While a theological student he taught poetry and rhetoric at the college of Vaulx and as pastor of Herent was professor of philosophy at a nearby seminary of canons regular.

In 1605 he came to the ecclesiastical seminary of Antwerp, taught philosophy and theology and later became superior. In 1608 he was canon, censor, and theologian of the church of Antwerp; in 1614 he was made protonotary. Beyerlinck was a priest, a rhetorician, orator, and administrator, and engaged continually in preaching and writing.

== Works ==
His works are mainly encyclopedic. He wrote, e.g. a second volume (Antwerp, 1611) of the Opus Chronographicum orbis universi a mundi exordio usque ad annum MDCXI (first volume to year 1572 by Opmeer), a collection of lives of popes, rulers, and illustrious men; and the Magnum Theatrum Vitae Humanae (Cologne, 1631, 7 vols; Lyon 1665-6, 8 vols; Venice, 1707, 8 vols), an encyclopedia of information on diverse subjects arranged in alphabetical order. Its scope ranges from theological dissertations to trivialities. It includes articles on beards, and on games. Much of its material was gathered by others, most notably Theodor Zwinger's Theatrum Humanae Vitae, but Beyerlinck gave the work its final form. Other publications are listed in bibliographies.
