= Felix Platter =

Swiss physician (1536–1614)

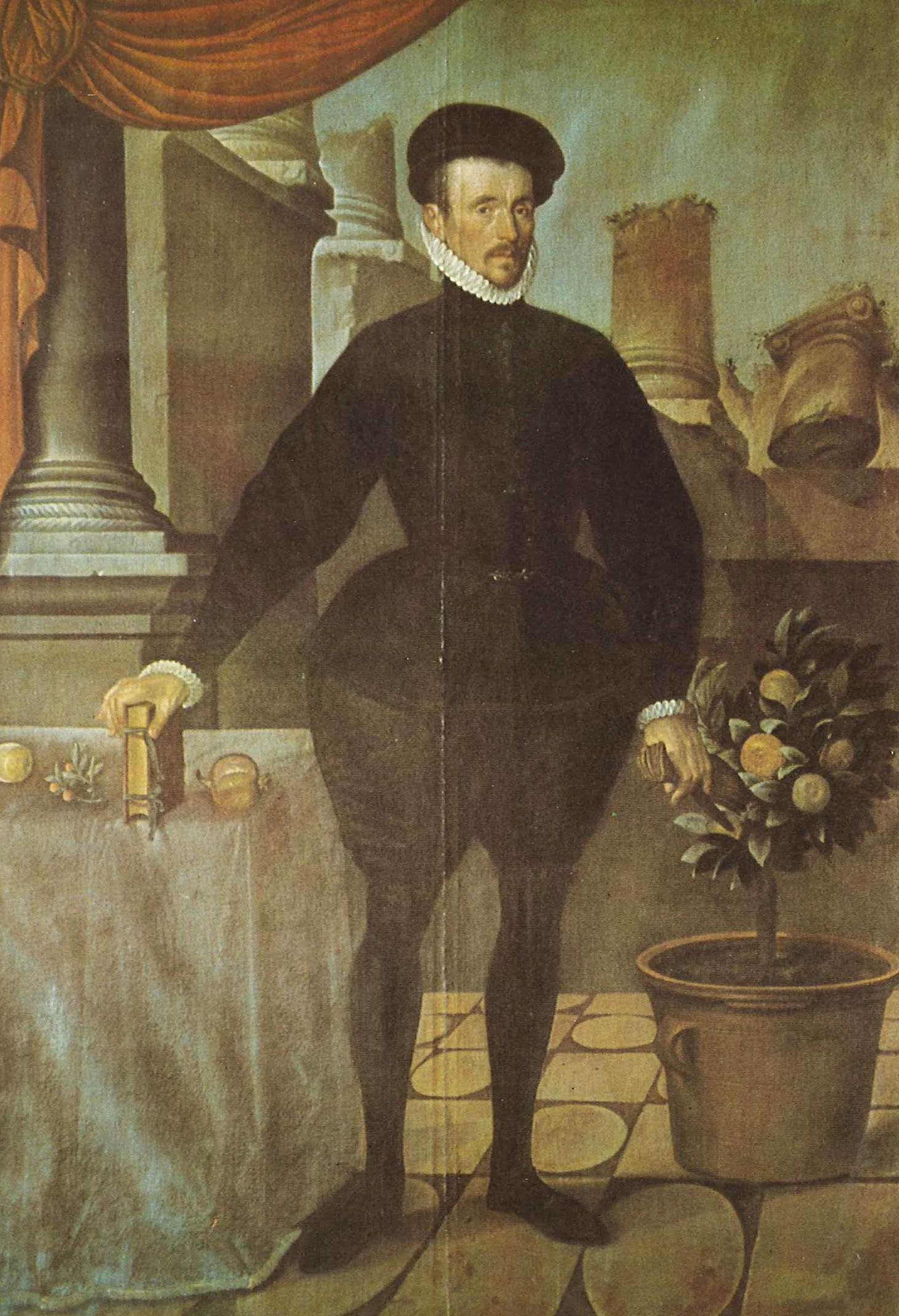
- Felix Platter (1584) by Hans Bock
- Born: 28 October 1536; Basel
- Died: 28 July 1614 (aged 77); Basel
- Other names: Felix Plater
- Education: University of Montpellier, University of Basel (M.D., 1557)
- Scientific career
- Fields: Medicine
- Institutions: University of Basel
- Doctoral advisor: Guillaume Rondelet
- Notable students: Gaspard Bauhin; Peter Monau; Petrus Ryff; Emmanuel Stupanus

Felix Platter (also Plater /ˈplɑːtər/; German: [ˈplatɐ]; Latinized: Platerus; 28 October 1536 – 28 July 1614) was a Swiss physician, botanist, and diarist. He is known for his research in several areas of medicine, including ophthalmology, psychiatry and paleopathology.

== Biography ==
Felix Platter was the son of Protestant humanist, schoolmaster, and printer, Thomas Platter, and the half-brother of Thomas Platter the Younger. In 1552, at the age of sixteen, Platter travelled by pony from Basel to the University of Montpellier to start a course of study under Guillaume Rondelet. He lodged in the house of Laurent Catalan, a pharmacist and a Marrano or Christian Jew. Platter's studies took place against a background of religious persecution; the French Wars of Religion would start within a decade.

Returning to Basel in 1557, Platter was awarded the medical doctorate by the University of Basel and established himself as a successful doctor. He became city physician and a professor of practical medicine. As part of his teaching, he carried out hundreds of dissections of the human body.

In 1602 and 1604, his book Praxeos (translated into English in the 1660s as Golden Practice of Physick) gave a rational classification of diseases, based on their symptoms and postmortem findings. He was notable for attributing mental illness to natural causes, although he still allowed the possibility of mental illness caused by an evil spirit. The book was quoted dozens of times by Robert Burton in The Anatomy of Melancholy.

During the plague of 1563-1564 in Basel, Platter stayed to attend the ill while other physicians fled. Four thousand people, a quarter of the city's population, died of the plague. Platter treated plague victims again during the epidemics of 1576, 1582, 1593, and 1609. He compiled detailed statistics on these epidemics.

He was the first to describe an intracranial tumor (a meningioma), hypertrophy of the thalamus, the broad tapeworm, and Dupuytren's contracture of the hand.

Finally, Platter did important work on ophthalmology. He identified the retina rather than the lens as the visual receptor of the eye. He observed congenital cataracts and was the first to recognize that people who worked near a fire (such as alchemists) were vulnerable to cataracts, now called glassblower's cataracts.

He had a strong inclination toward music; he played the lute and translated songs into the Basel dialect. His friends in the scholarly world included Conrad Gessner and Theodor Zwinger.

Platter amassed a famous collection of curiosities at his house, including art, musical instruments, precious stones, and biological specimens. Part of his herbarium is preserved at the University of Bern, including 813 specimens from Switzerland, France, Italy, Spain, and Egypt. Michel de Montaigne, on a visit to Basel in 1580, admired Platter's collection: "it was his practice, instead of painting like other botanists the plants according to their natural colors, to glue the same upon paper with so great care and dexterity that the smallest leaves and fibres should be visible, exactly as in nature.... At this house, and in the public school as well, we saw entire skeletons of men."

Platter's diary gives a vivid account of his childhood, his life as a medical student at Montpellier, and his travels in France.

== Writings ==
- Platter, Felix (1583). De corporis humani structura et usu. 3 volumes. Basel: Ambrosius Froben.
- Platter, Felix (1602–1608). Praxeos seu de cognoscendis, praedicendis, praecavendis, curandisque homini incommodantibus tractatus. Basel: Konrad Waldkirch. Vol. 1: De functionum laesionibus; vol. 2: De doloribus; vol. 3: De vitiis.
- Platter, Felix (1614). Observationum in hominis affectibus plerisque corpori et animo functionum laesione, dolore aliave molestia et vitio incommodantibus libri tres. Basel: Ludwig König.
- Platter, Felix (1976). Valentin Lötscher (ed.). Tagebuch: (Lebensbeschreibung); 1536-1567. Basel, Stuttgart: Schwabe. ISBN 3-7965-0615-1.
- Platter, Felix (1987). Valentin Lötscher (ed.). Beschreibung der Stadt Basel 1610 und Pestbericht 1610/11. Basel, Stuttgart: Schwabe. ISBN 3-7965-0860-X.

== Bibliography ==
- Ladurie, Emmanuel Le Roy (1997) [1995]. The Beggar and the Professor: a Sixteenth-Century Family Saga. Translated by Arthur Goldhammer. Chicago: University of Chicago Press. ISBN 0-226-47323-6.
- Platter, Felix (1961). Beloved Son Felix: the Journal of Felix Platter, a Medical Student in Montpellier in the Sixteenth Century. Translated by Seán Jennett. London: Frederick Muller.
