= Bartolomeo Eustachi =

Italian anatomist

Bartolomeo Eustachio
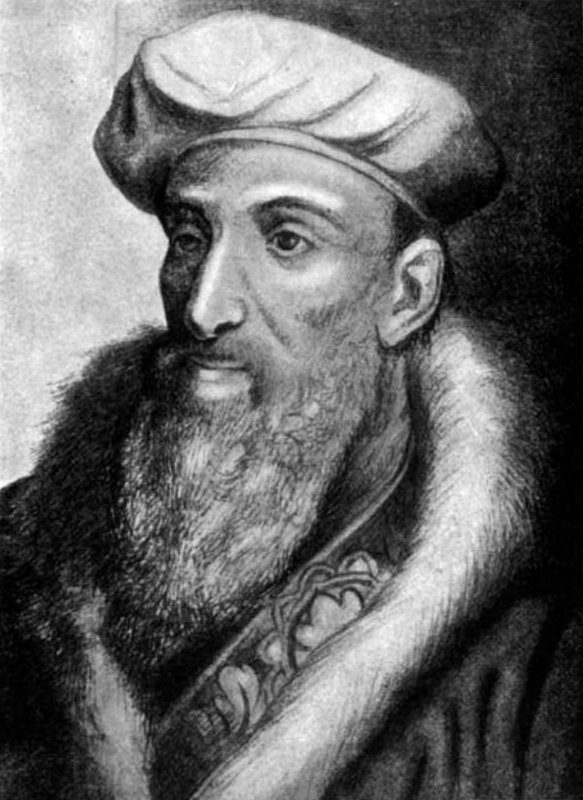
- Born: 1500–1510; San Severino
- Died: 27 August 1574; Fossombrone
- Other name: Bartholom(a)eus Eustachius
- Known for: Eustachian tube and Eustachian valve
- Scientific career
- Fields: anatomist, university teacher, physician
- Notable students: Volcher Coiter

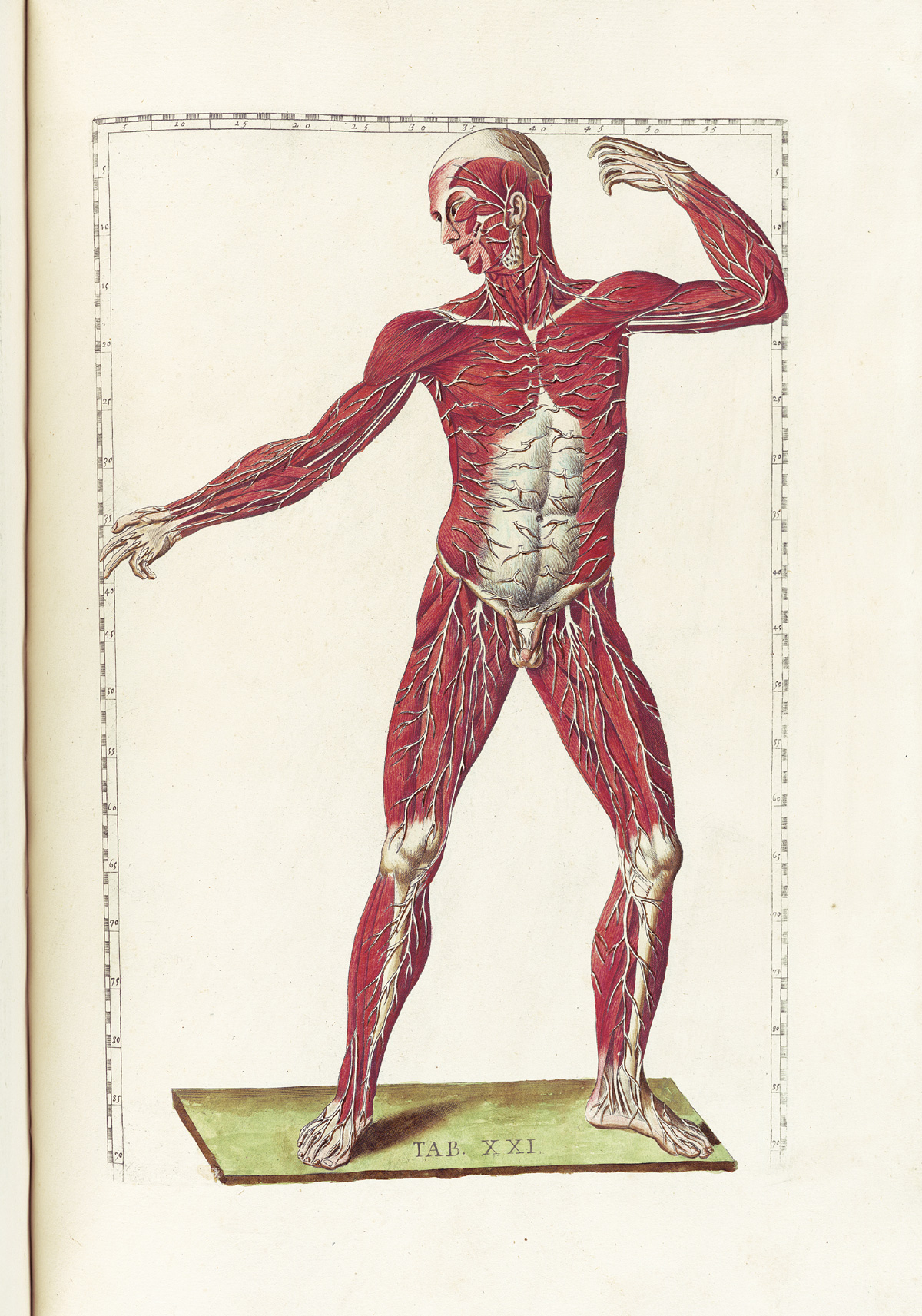
Tabulae anatomicae (Rome, 1783): Table 21

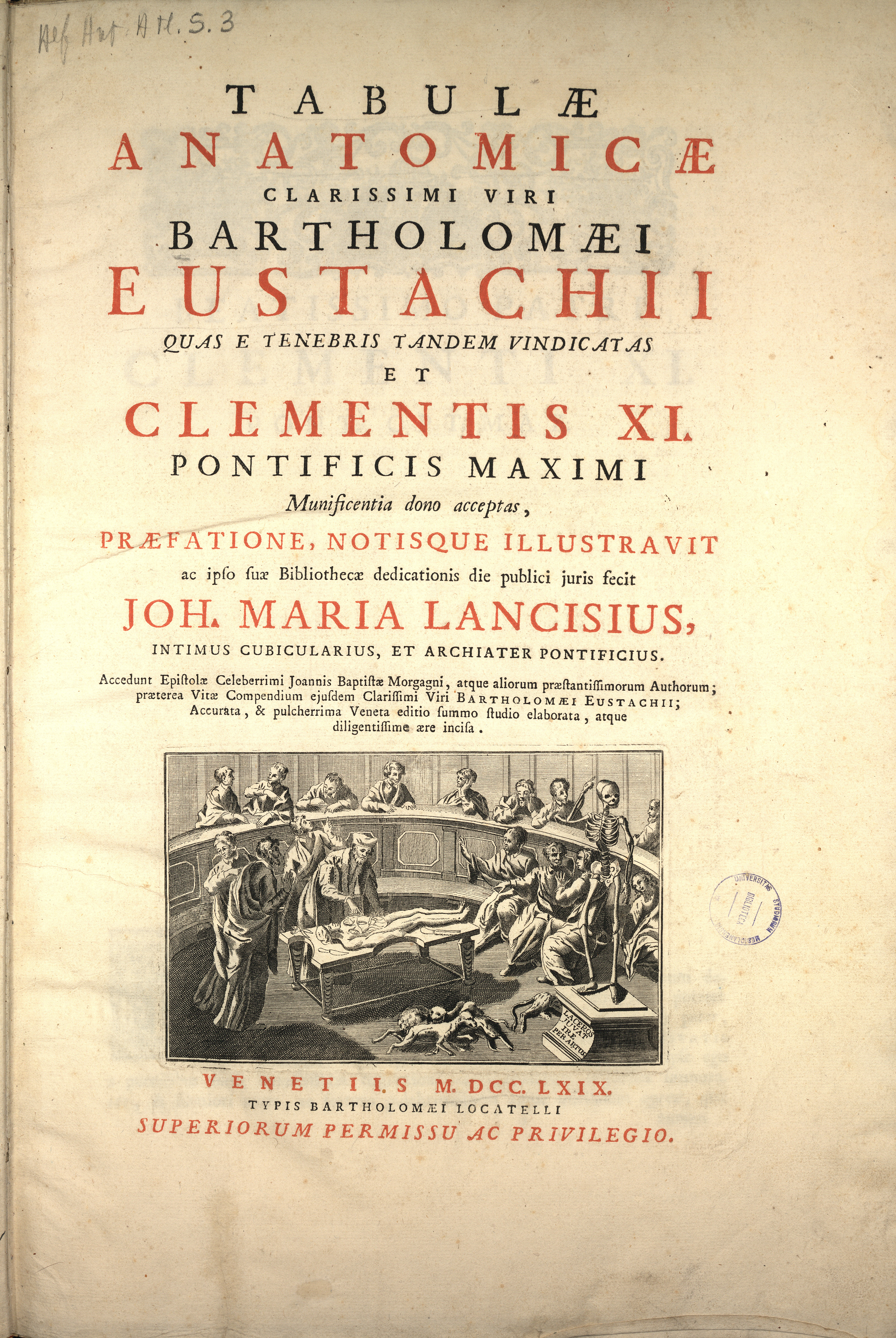
Tabulae anatomicae (Rome, 1783): Title page

Bartolomeo Eustachi (1500–1510 – 27 August 1574), also known as Eustachio or by his Latin name of Bartholomaeus Eustachius (/juːˈsteɪʃəs/), was an Italian anatomist and one of the founders of the science of human anatomy.

== Biography ==
Bartolomeo was born in San Severino in the province of Ancona, where his father, Mariano Eustachio, was a wealthy and prominent physician. Bartolomeo received the required broad humanistic education typical of that time, and then studied medicine at the Archiginnasio della Sapienza in Rome. He was also well versed in Hebrew, Arabic, and Greek, which gave him access to original medical treatises written in those languages. As a physician, Eustachius enjoyed great prestige among the upper classes, having among his patients the Duke of Urbino, the Cardinal della Rovero, and the Duke of Terranova. He became a member of the Medical College of Rome and in 1549 was appointed Professor of Anatomy at the Papal College, the Archiginnasio dell Sapienza. He soon obtained papal dispensation to dissect cadavers from patients from the Santo Spirito Hospital.

During 1562 and 1563 Bartolomeo Eustachio (writing under the Latin surname Eustacius) wrote a remarkable series of scientific works on the anatomy of the kidney, the hearing apparatus, the teeth and their structure, and the circulatory system, including the lower vena cava and its valves (now known as the Eustachian valve). These works were organized and published (illustrated with eight plates) as Opscula Anatomica in 1564.

Eustachius was deeply interested in understanding the anatomical structures of the human body through direct observation, instead of accepting the many a priori theories current among other physicians. His anatomical investigations into the vena caval Eustachian valve, led him to conclude that its function was to avoid reflux of blood. He also discovered the thoracic canal. Trying to understand how diseases affected body structures, Eustachius made comparative anatomical analysis of healthy and disease-altered organs (pathological anatomy). Working with Pier Matteo Pini, he produced a series of 47 detailed drawings of the studied organs. This series of illustrations, Tabulae Anatomicae Clariviri, was published in 1714.

Eustachio extended knowledge of the internal ear by rediscovering and describing correctly the Eustachian tube that bears his name. He was the first to describe the internal and anterior muscles of the malleus and the stapedius, and the complicated figure of the cochlea. He was the first to study accurately the anatomy of the teeth, and the phenomena of the first and second dentitions. Eustachius also discovered the adrenal glands (reported in 1563). His greatest work, which he was unable to publish, was his Anatomical Engravings. These were completed in 1552, nine years after Vesalius had published his magnum opus, De Humani Corporis Fabrica Libri Septem in Basel.

Published in 1714 by Giovanni Maria Lancisi at the expense of Pope Clement XI, and again in 1744 by Cajetan Petrioli, and again in 1744 by Bernhard Siegfried Albinus, and subsequently at Bonn in 1790, the engravings show that Eustachius had dissected with the greatest care and diligence, and had taken the utmost pains to give accurate views of the shape, size, and relative position of the organs of the human body.

The first seven plates illustrate the history of the kidneys and some of the facts relating to the structure of the ear. The eighth represents the heart, the ramifications of the vena azygos, and the valves of the vena cava. The seven subsequent plates offer different views of the viscera of the chest and abdomen. The seventeenth contains the brain and spinal cord; and the eighteenth more accurate views of the origin, course, and distribution of the nerves than had been given before. Fourteen plates are devoted to the muscles.

Eustachius did not confine his research to the study of comparative anatomy. He attempted to derive the physiology of organs on the basis of their anatomy. He did not restrict himself to gross anatomy: what was too minute for unassisted vision he inspected by means of glasses (early microscopes). Structure that could not be understood in their pristine state he unfolded by maceration in different fluids, or rendered more distinct by injection and exsiccation.

He was known as a supporter of the 2nd century AD Roman anatomist Galen, entering into a public dispute with the eminent contemporary anatomist, Vesalius. However, both made their anatomic observations from dissection of human cadavers.

Eustachius died in Umbria in 1574, during a trip to meet Cardinal della Rovere.

== Works ==
- Bartolomeo, Eustachi (1564), "Opuscula Anatomica"
- Bartolomeo Eustachi (1728), Tabulae anatomicae – digital facsimile from the Linda Hall Library
