= Thomas Platter =

Swiss scholar and writer

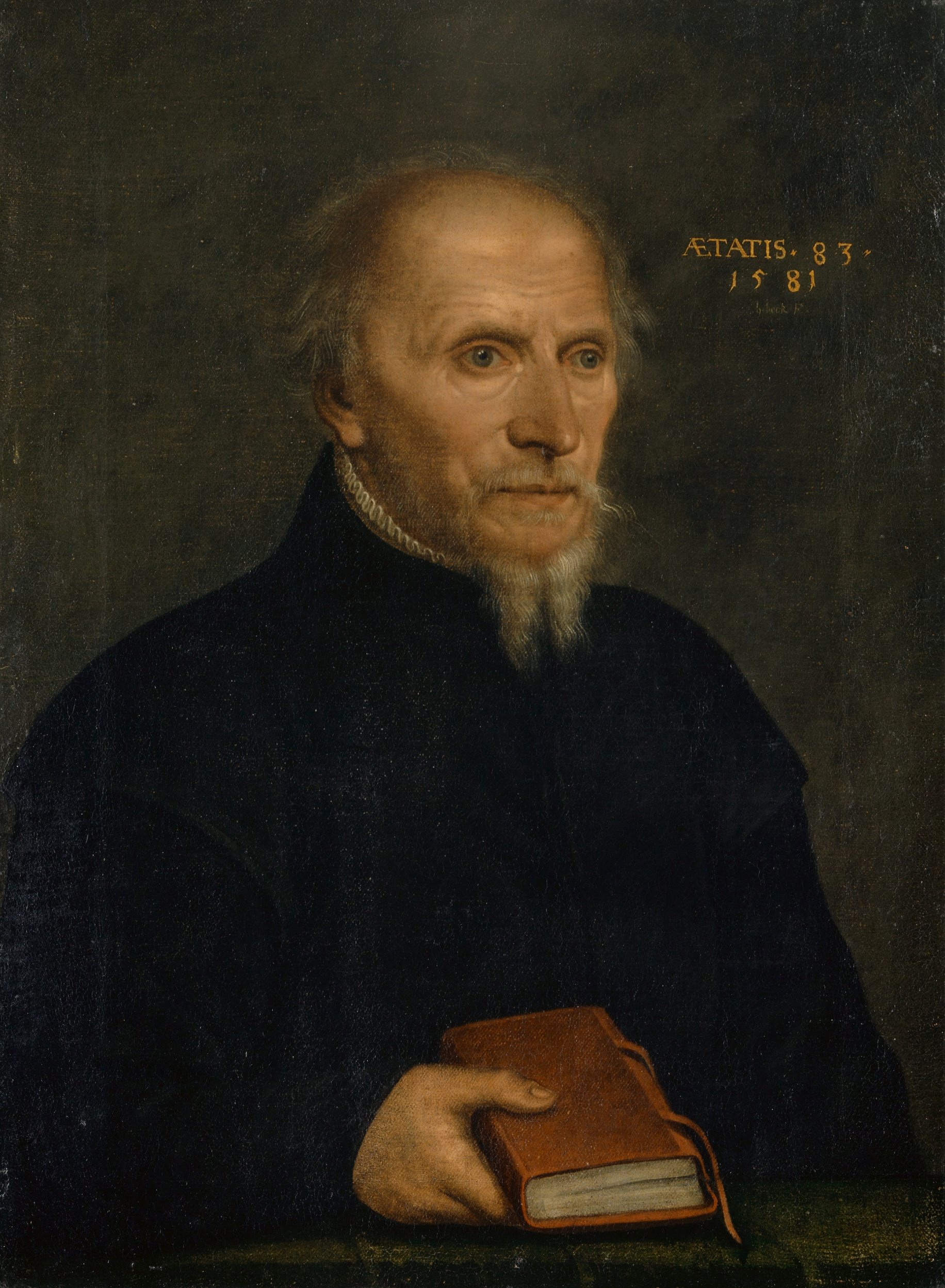
- Thomas Platter (1581) by Hans Bock
- Born: February 10, 1499; Grächen
- Died: January 26, 1582; Basel
- Children: Felix Platter and Thomas Platter the Younger

Thomas Platter the Elder (/ˈplɑːtər/; German: [ˈplatɐ]; 10 February 1499, in Grächen, Valais – 26 January 1582, in Basel) was a Swiss humanist scholar and teacher. He was an early follower of the Protestant Reformation.

== Biography ==
Thomas Platter (the Elder) grew up in poverty. As a child, he wandered through Germany, Poland, and Hungary, begging for money and struggling to find an education. He ultimately mastered several languages, including Latin, Greek, and Hebrew.

After his return to Switzerland, he became an assistant to the Protestant leader Huldrych Zwingli in Zurich. In 1531, Zwingli was killed in the Battle of Kappel. In view of the political situation in Zurich after the war, Platter left for Basel, together with his friend and mentor, the Protestant theologian Oswald Myconius.

In Basel, Platter earned a reputation as a teacher of ancient languages and literature. From 1535 to 1544, he led a printing house with Johannes Oporinus and Ruprecht Winter, publishing various classical texts. They published the first edition of John Calvin's Institutes of the Christian Religion.

In 1544, Platter was invited to become the principal of the Gymnasium at the Münsterplatz in Basel. He demanded a high salary, which was approved on condition that he would not disclose it to the public. In 1549, Platter bought and renovated Gundeldingen Castle in Basel.

Platter's autobiography includes a detailed account of his youth and of how he became a humanist scholar. It is considered a classic of autobiographical writing in German.

His sons Felix Platter and Thomas Platter the Younger both studied medicine, a thwarted ambition of Platter's own early life. All three Platters left memoirs and travel diaries, which have been used for a joint biography by Emmanuel Le Roy Ladurie.

== Bibliography ==
- Ladurie, Emmanuel Le Roy (1997) [1995]. The Beggar and the Professor: a Sixteenth-Century Family Saga. Translated by Arthur Goldhammer. Chicago: University of Chicago Press. ISBN 0-226-47323-6.
- Platter, Thomas (1839). The autobiography of Thomas Platter, a schoolmaster of the sixteenth century. Translated by Elizabeth Anne McCaul Finn. London: B. Wertheim.
- Platter, Thomas (2006) [1944]. Hartmann, Alfred (ed.). Lebensbeschreibung (3rd ed.). Basel, Stuttgart: Schwabe. ISBN 978-3-7965-1372-5.
- Rabb, Theodore K. (1993). Renaissance Lives: Portraits of an Age. New York: Pantheon Books. ISBN 0-679-40781-2.
