= Hans Bock (painter) =

German painter

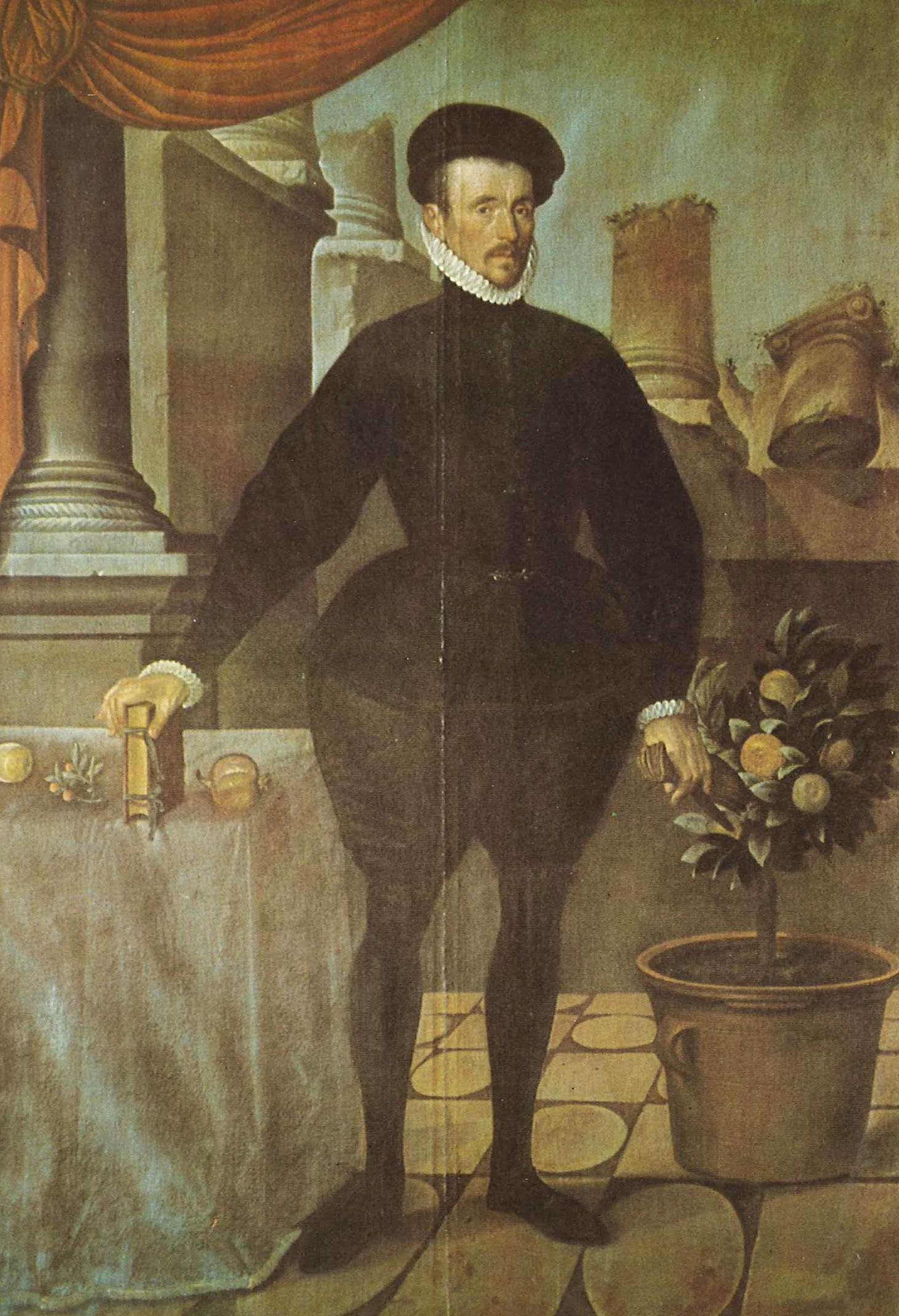
Felix Platter, painting from 1584.

Hans Bock (1550, in Saverne – 16 March 1624, in Basel) was a 16th Century German painter and draughtsman. He flourished at Basel where he executed several large frescoes, which won him much fame.

Bock is likely to have been working in Basel as early as 1570; in 1572 he paid for membership to the local guild of painters. He was awarded citizenship to Basel on the 18th of July, 1572. In 1571 and 1572, while still being trained by Hans Hug Kluber, he designed two murals for the house of Theodor Zwinger, but it is not known if one was executed.

From 1588 to 1591, he cooperated with the scholar Basilius Amerbach in the excavation of the Roman theater Augusta Raurica, providing illustrations of the newly excavated site. He is likely to have educated the young Joseph Heintz in draughtsmanship.

Bock had five children; Emanuel Bock the Elder, Felix Bock, Hans Bock the Younger, Niklaus Bock and Peter Bock.
