= Theodor Zwinger =

Swiss physician and scholar

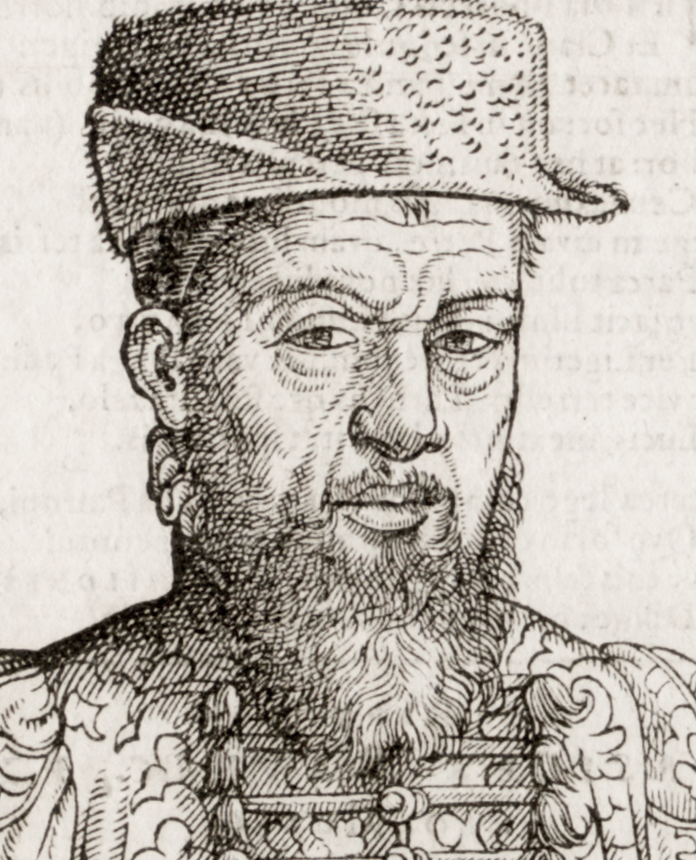
- Theodor Zwinger
- Born: 2 August 1533; Basel, Switzerland
- Died: 10 March 1588 (aged 54); Basel, Switzerland
- Education: University of Basel; University of Lyon; University of Paris; University of Padua
- Scientific career
- Fields: Medicine
- Workplaces: University of Basel
- Doctoral advisor: Bassiano Landi
- Other academic advisors: Thomas Platter; Petrus Ramus; Vettore Trincavelli; Gabriele Falloppio
- Notable students: Petrus Ryff

Theodor Zwinger the Elder (Swiss Standard German: [ˈt͡svɪŋər]; 2 August 1533 – 10 March 1588) was a Swiss physician and Renaissance humanist scholar. He made significant contributions to the emerging genres of reference and travel literature. He was the first distinguished representative of a prominent Basel academic family.

== Life and work ==
Zwinger was the son of Leonhard Zwinger, a furrier who had become a citizen of Basel in 1526. His mother was Christina Herbster, the sister of Johannes Oporinus (Herbster) the famed humanist printer. After Zwinger's father's death, Christina married the noted humanist Conrad Lycosthenes (Wolffhart).

Zwinger studied at the Universities of Basel, Lyon, and Paris before taking a doctorate in medicine at the University of Padua with Bassiano Landi, the successor of Johannes Baptista Montanus. In Paris he studied with the iconoclastic philosopher Petrus Ramus. He joined the faculty of the University of Basel as a member of the consilium facultatis medicae from 1559. At Basel he held successively chairs in Greek (1565), Ethics (1571), and finally theoretical medicine (1580). While originally hostile to Paracelsus, in his later career he took an interest in Paracelsian medical theory for which he experienced some hostility. He associated with Paracelsians such as Thomas Moffet, Petrus Severinus and Claude Aubery.

Zwinger was the editor of the early encyclopedia Theatrum Humanae Vitae (editions 1565, 1571, 1586, 1604). The work is considered "perhaps the most comprehensive collection of knowledge to be compiled by a single individual in the early modern period." He was able to draw on the knowledge base of his stepfather Conrad Lycosthenes in compiling the Theatrum Humanae Vitae.

A Catholicized version of the Theatrum entitled the Magnum theatrum vitae humanae (1631) by Lawrence Beyerlinck was one of the largest printed commonplace books of the early modern era. These two works "may fairly be described as the early modern ancestors of the great dictionnaire raisonné of the eighteenth-century Enlightenment, the Encyclopédie of Diderot."

=== Personal life ===
He seemed to have a difficult to read handwriting and Casiodoro de Reyna once would have liked to travel from Frankfurt to Basel in order for Zwinger to read de Reyna his own letters. The house he resided in, is named Zwingerhouse in his memory. Zwinger's son, Jakob Zwinger, briefly served as his successor as editor of the Theatrum. His descendant Theodor Zwinger the Younger (1597–1654) was a prominent preacher and theology professor.

== Works ==
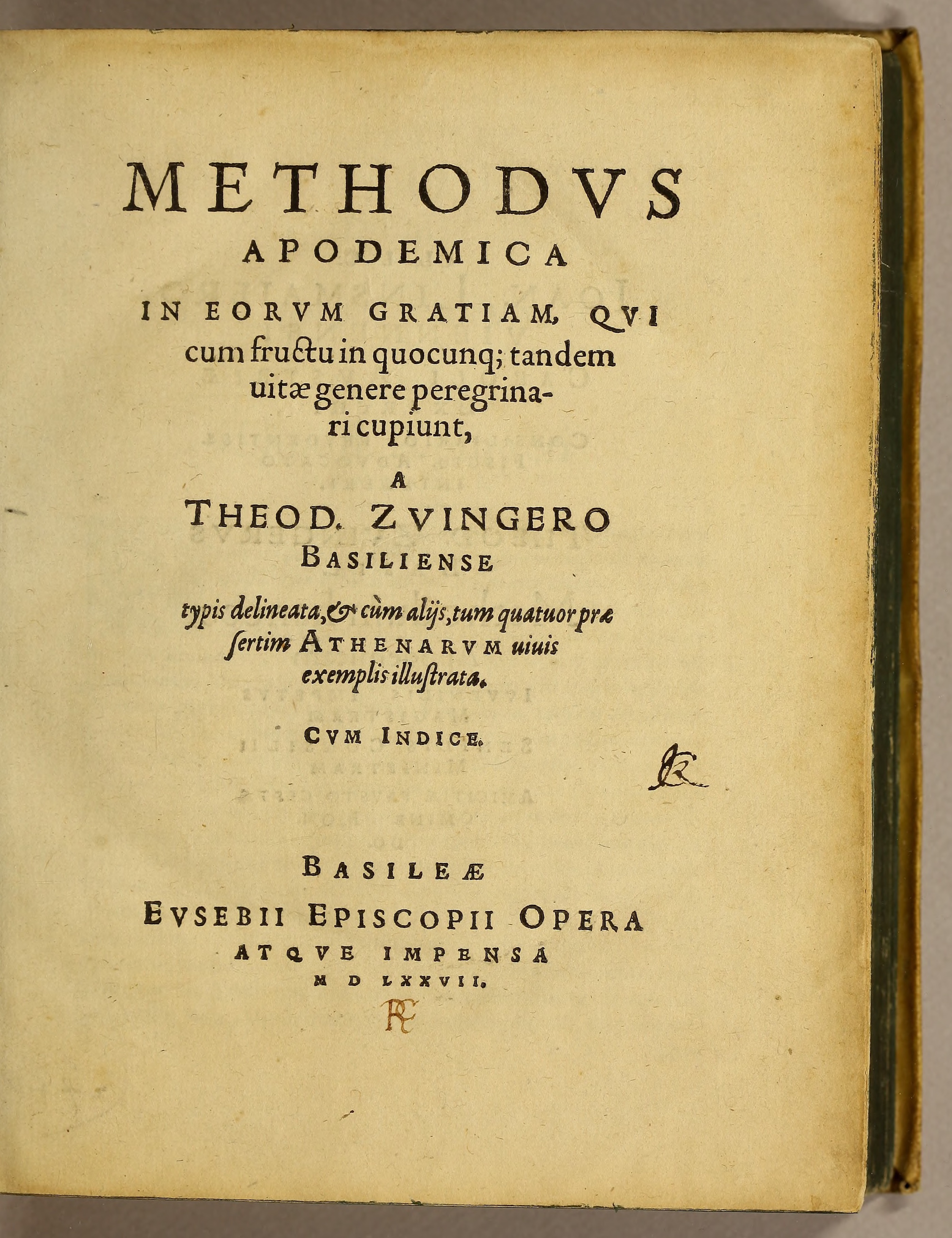
Title page, Methodus apodemica (Basel 1577)

- Lycosthenes, Conrad; Zwinger, Theodor. Theatrum vitæ humanæ, Basel, 1565, 1571, 1586, 1596 et 1604, 5 vol. totalling 4376 pages (on line: the 1586 edition) — an early encyclopedia
- Morum philosophia poetica ex Veterum utriusque linguæ poetarum thesauris cognoscendæ veritatis et exercendæ virtutis, Basel, 1575 : vol. 1 (books 1 to 4); vol. 2 (books 5 to 18) — [Poetical philosophy]
- Methodus apodemica in eorum gratiam, qui cum fructu in quocunq[ue] tandem vitæ genere peregrinari cupiunt, Basel, 1577 — an early example of travel literature
