= Canton of Seuil-d'Argonne =

Former canton in Meuse, France

Coordinates: 48°58′17″N 5°00′41″E

- Former canton
- Location of the canton in the arrondissement of Bar-le-Duc
- Country: France
- Region: Grand Est
- Department: Meuse
- No. of communes: {{{nbcomm}}}
- Disbanded: 2015

Government
  - Representatives: Dominique Maréchal
- Population (2012): 1,880

The canton of Seuil-d'Argonne (French: Canton de Seuil-d'Argonne) is a former French canton located in the department of Meuse in the Lorraine region (now part of Grand Est). This canton was organized around Seuil-d'Argonne in the arrondissement of Bar-le-Duc. It is now part of the canton of Dieue-sur-Meuse.

The last general councillor from this canton was Dominique Maréchal (UMP), elected in 2011.

== Composition ==
The canton of Seuil-d'Argonne grouped together 13 municipalities and had 1,880 inhabitants (2012 census without double counts).

1. Autrécourt-sur-Aire
2. Beaulieu-en-Argonne
3. Beausite
4. Brizeaux
5. Èvres
6. Foucaucourt-sur-Thabas
7. Ippécourt
8. Lavoye
9. Nubécourt
10. Pretz-en-Argonne
11. Seuil-d'Argonne
12. Les Trois-Domaines
13. Waly
