= Turrianus =

Spanish theologian (1509–1580)

Francisco Torres known as Turrianus (c. 1509 – 21 November 1580), was a Spanish Jesuit Hellenist and polemicist.

== Biography ==
Francisco Torres was born in Herrera, Palencia, the nephew of Bartolomé Torres, bishop of the Canaries. He studied at Salamanca and lived in Rome with Cardinal Giovanni Salviati and Seripando.

In 1562 Pope Pius IV sent him to the Council of Trent, and on 8 January, 1567, he became a Jesuit. He was professor at the Roman College, took part in the revision of the Sixtine Vulgate, and had Hosius and Baronius for literary associates. His contemporaries called him helluo librorum (glutton of books) for the rapidity with which he examined the principal libraries. In the last several years of his life, Turrianus had an ongoing battle of books with the French Protestant Antoine de la Roche Chandieu. He remained in Rome, where he died.

He defended the doctrines of the Immaculate Conception, the authority of the sovereign pontiff over the council, the Divinely appointed authority of bishops, Communion under one kind for the laity, the authenticity of the Apostolic Canons and the Pseudo-Isidorian decretals, and pleading the antiquity of the feast of the Presentation of the Blessed Virgin, which Pius V had suppressed, worked for its reinstatement.

David Blondel accuses him of a lack of critical judgment, and Gérónimo Nadàl accused him of mordacity against Protestants. He wrote more than seventy books, principally polemical, against Protestants, and translations especially of Greek Fathers, many treatises of whose works he found hidden away in libraries.

A cause for his beatification was formally opened on 20 May 1628, granting him the title of Servant of God. He was later declared Venerable.
