= Antoine de la Roche Chandieu =

French Reformed theologian, poet, diplomat and nobleman

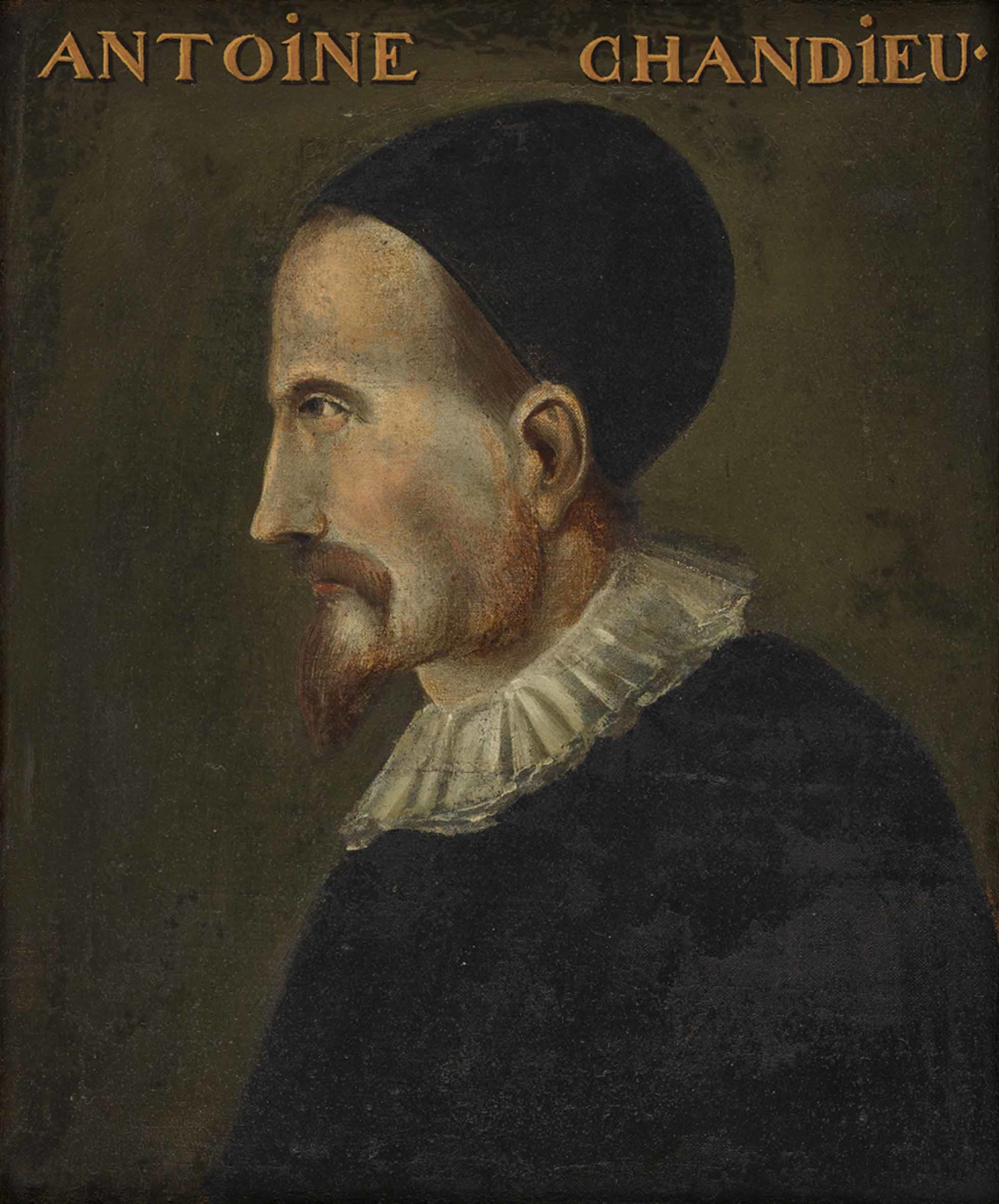

Antoine de la Roche Chandieu (1534 in Castle of Chabot (near Mâcon) – February 23, 1591 in Geneva) was a French Reformed theologian, poet, diplomat and nobleman. His trend toward the Reformed Protestantism was strengthened during his study of law at Toulouse; after a theological course at Geneva, he became the pastor of the Reformed congregation of Paris between 1556 and 1562.

On the night of September 4, 1557, a Protestant meeting was attacked, and 140 persons were imprisoned. Chandieu published his Remonstrance au Roi and his Apologie des bons Chrétiens contre les ennemis de l'église catholique. Consequently, he was arrested but was soon released at the intervention of Antoine de Bourbon. Though still in his twenties, Chandieu was one of the leaders of French Protestantism.

In 1558, he went to Orléans but soon returned to Paris. He took an active part in the deliberations of the first national synod of the Reformed Church in France which was held in Paris on May 26–28, 1559 and assisted in preparing a confession of faith. He presided at the third national synod at Orléans, April 25, 1562, where Jean Morély's doctrine regarding the general right of voting at ecclesiastical elections was condemned. The controversy nevertheless continued, and Chandieu wrote a rejoinder, La confirmation de la discipline ecclésiastique observée en églises réformées de France (Geneva, 1566). At the eighth national synod, held at Nîmes, May 6, 1572, the matter of Morély who was seconded by Peter Ramus, De Rosier, Nicolas Bergeron, and others, was again taken up and again condemned.

After the St. Bartholomew's Day Massacre (1572), Chandieu fled to Switzerland, and lived first at Geneva and afterward at Lausanne and Aubonne in the Vaud (then under Bernese overlordship), everywhere advocating and defending the cause of his countrymen, many of whom lived in Switzerland. In Lausanne he became friends with Claude Aubery, Professor of Philosophy at the Lausanne Academy. In the religious war of 1585 he was field-chaplain to Henry of Navarre; but in May 1588, he returned to his family at Geneva, where he died three years later, lamented by the Protestants of Geneva and France.

Chandieu published under various pseudonyms including Zamariel, Sadeel, and Theopsaltes. He had a seven-year battle of books with the Jesuit Francisco Torres.
