= Claude Aubery =

French physician and philosopher

- Born: Circa 1545; Triaucourt, Meuse, France
- Died: April 1596; Dijon, Côte-d'Or, France
- Other names: Claude Auberi; Claudius Alberius Triuncurianus; Claudius Alberius Campanus
- Known for: Alberianism
- Scientific career
- Fields: Physician, philosopher, theologian
- Institutions: Academy of Lausanne

Claude Aubery, Claude Auberi or Claudius Alberius Triuncurianus (Note: From Triaucourt near Châlons-sur-Marne.) (circa 1545, Triaucourt, Meuse - April 1596, Dijon) was a French Reformed Protestant physician, philosopher and theologian. His doctrine, close to that of Sebastian Castellio or Andreas Osiander, was called Alberianism.

He should not be confused with Claude Aubery son of Nicolas, pastor of Collonge-Bellerive and Corsier from 1578 to 1590, of Collonges-Fort-l'Écluse around 1590–1592, and of Grand-Saconnex from 1592 to 1608.

== Biography ==
Claude Aubery embraced Protestantism. A Protestant refugee from Champagne in 1563, he did part of his studies in Geneva, but he also travelled back and forth to Paris during periods of lull in the persecutions. He returned in Switzerland early enough to escape persecution in France in 1568. In 1571 he was in Basel, where he became friends with Theodor Zwinger a member of the consilium facultatis medicae from 1559, with whom he obtained the title of Doctor of Medicine.

In 1576, he was called by the academy of Lausanne to take up the post of Professor of Philosophy. In Lausanne, he became friends with Antoine de la Roche Chandieu, a refugee after Saint Bartholomew's Day. He published in 1585 in Geneva with Jean Le Preux, a book entitled Oratio apodictica, de resurrectione mortuorum a criticism of the traditional Calvinism prevalent in Switzerland in the 16th century.

His name appears at the Montbéliard Colloquium, at the castle of Montbéliard (Note: At the time Montbéliard was a French-speaking county governed by the Lutheran German-speaking Louis III, Duke of Württemberg), from 21 to 26 March 1586, between Lutherans and Reformed:

“On the Lutheran side appeared Andrea and Lucas Osiander, assisted by the two political counsellors, Hans Wolf von Anweil and Frederich Schiitz; on the part of the Reformed, Beza, Abraham Musculus (pastor at Berne), Anton Fajus (deacon at Geneva), Peter Hybner (professor of the Greek language at Berne), Claudius Alberius (professor of philosophy at Lausanne), and the two counsellors, Samuel Meyer, of Berne, and Anton Marisius, of Geneva.”

The main subject of the colloquium was that of predestination; the theses presented by Beza were accepted and signed by Aubery, who thus made a name for himself in the world of theology.

in 1587, Aubery had a new series of speeches printed in Lausanne by Jean Chiquelle, which he collected under this title: De fide catholica apostolica romana, contra apostatas omnes, qui ab illa ipsa fide defecerunt, orationes apodicticae. In this work, a sort of commentary on the Epistle to the Romans, Aubery set out theories close to those of Andreas Osiander on justification, and their heterodoxy caused a great stir throughout Switzerland reminiscent of Osiander's controversy.

His book was censured notably by Theodore Beza and in 1588, at the Synod of Bern, Aubery had to accept his judgment.

“Aubery did not have a combative nature; gentleness and love of peace characterised his person.”

After several attacks, Aubery officially submitted on 12 July 1593 by writing a declaration in which he maintained that “there is no merit in us that can serve as a basis for our justification and that good works are the effect and not the cause of our regeneration.” He then returned to France and returned to Catholicism.

He was also interested in alchemy and met Oswald Croll and Wenceslas Lavinius to whom he dedicated a book: De concordia medicorum, disputatio exoterica. Ad Vencislaum Lavinium ab Ottenfeld, Moravum. He supported the doctrine of Paracelsus but remained cautious about the hypothesis of the philosopher's stone while being a fervent supporter of the doctrine of signatures.

== Works ==
- Various translations of Greek works : Vetustissimorum authorum Georgica, Bucolica et Gnomica poemata quae supersunt. Quorum omnium catalogum, et quid sigillatim ad eorum explicationem hoc <enchiridiô> detur, sequentes paginae indicant. J. le Preux. 1569.
- Posteriorum notionum quas secundas intentiones et praedicabilia vocant, brevis et luculenta explicatio (in Latin). 1576.
- Περὶ ἑρμηνείας, seu de Enuntiationibus, quas propositiones vocant, in quibus verum et falsum primo dijudicantur (in Latin). François Le Preux. 1577.
- Théocrite. Theocriti aliorumque poetarum Idyllia. Ejusdem Epigrammata. Simmiae,... Ovum, Alae, Securis, Fistula. Dosiadis Ara. Omnia cum interpretatione latina. In Virgilianas et Nas. [Nasonianas] imitationes Theocriti observationes H. Stephani (in Latin). Translated by Aubery, Claude. (1579)
- Organon. Id est : instrumentum doctrinarum omnium : in duas partes divisum. Nempe, in Analyticum eruditionis modum, et Dialecticam : sive methodum disputandi in utramque partem (in Latin). Morges: J. le Preux. 1584.
- De terraemotu, oratio analytica, in qua, hybornae, pagi, in ditione illustriss. Reip. Bernensis, supra lacum Lemannum, per terraemotum oppressi, historia paucis attingitur (in Latin). J. le Preux. 1585.
- De concordia medicorum (in Latin). Morges: J. le Preux. 1585.
- Oratio apodictica, de resurrectione mortuorum (in Latin). Geneva: Jean Le Preux. 1585.
- de Immortalitate animae oratio apodictica (in Latin). Geneva: Jean le Preux. 1586.
- De charitate christiana (in Latin). Morges: J. Le Preux. 1586.
- De fide catholica apostolica romana, contra apostatas omnes, qui ab illa ipsa fide defecerunt, orationes apodicticae (in Latin). Lausanne: Jean Chiquelle. 1587.
- An edition of Theophrastus' Characters :Thesaurus philosophiae moralis, quo continentur, graece et latine, Epicteti enchiridion. Cebetis thebani tabula. Theophrasti characteres. Pythagoreorum fragmenta, Cantero et Spondano interpret (in Latin). J. le Preux. 1589.
