= Foucaucourt-sur-Thabas =

- Commune
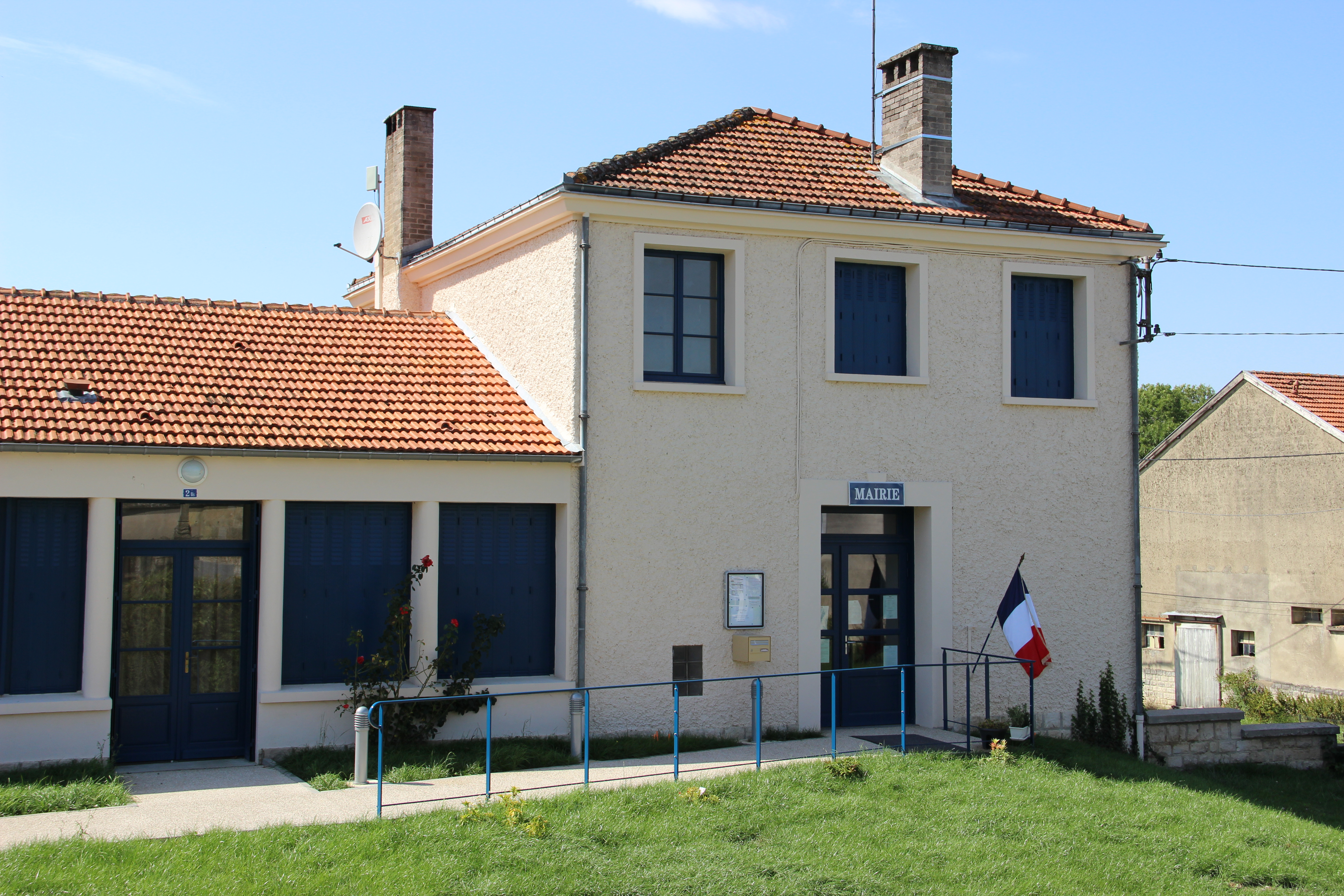
- The town hall in Foucaucourt-sur-Thabas

- Coat of arms
- Location of Foucaucourt-sur-Thabas
- Location within France Location within Grand Est
- Coordinates: 48°59′59″N 5°06′06″E
- Country: France
- Region: Grand Est
- Department: Meuse
- Arrondissement: Bar-le-Duc
- Canton: Dieue-sur-Meuse
- Intercommunality: CC de l'Aire à l'Argonne

Government
  - Mayor (2020–2026): Clarisse Jacquet
- Area^{1}: 9.92 km^{2} (3.83 sq mi)
- Elevation: 124 m (407 ft)
- Highest elevation: 231 m (758 ft)
- Lowest elevation: 175 m (574 ft)
- Population (2023): 57
  - Density: 5.7/km^{2} (15/sq mi)
- Time zone: UTC+01:00 (CET)
  - Summer (DST): UTC+02:00 (CEST)
- INSEE/Postal code: 55194 /55250
- ^{1} French Land Register data, which excludes lakes, ponds, glaciers > 1 km^{2} (0.386 sq mi or 247 acres) and river estuaries.

Foucaucourt-sur-Thabas is a village and a commune in the Argonne region in the Meuse department in Grand Est in north-eastern France.
It is the only village in the commune.
The nearest town is Sainte-Menehould, 'capital' of the Argonne, some 27 km to the northeast.

== See also ==
- Communes of the Meuse department
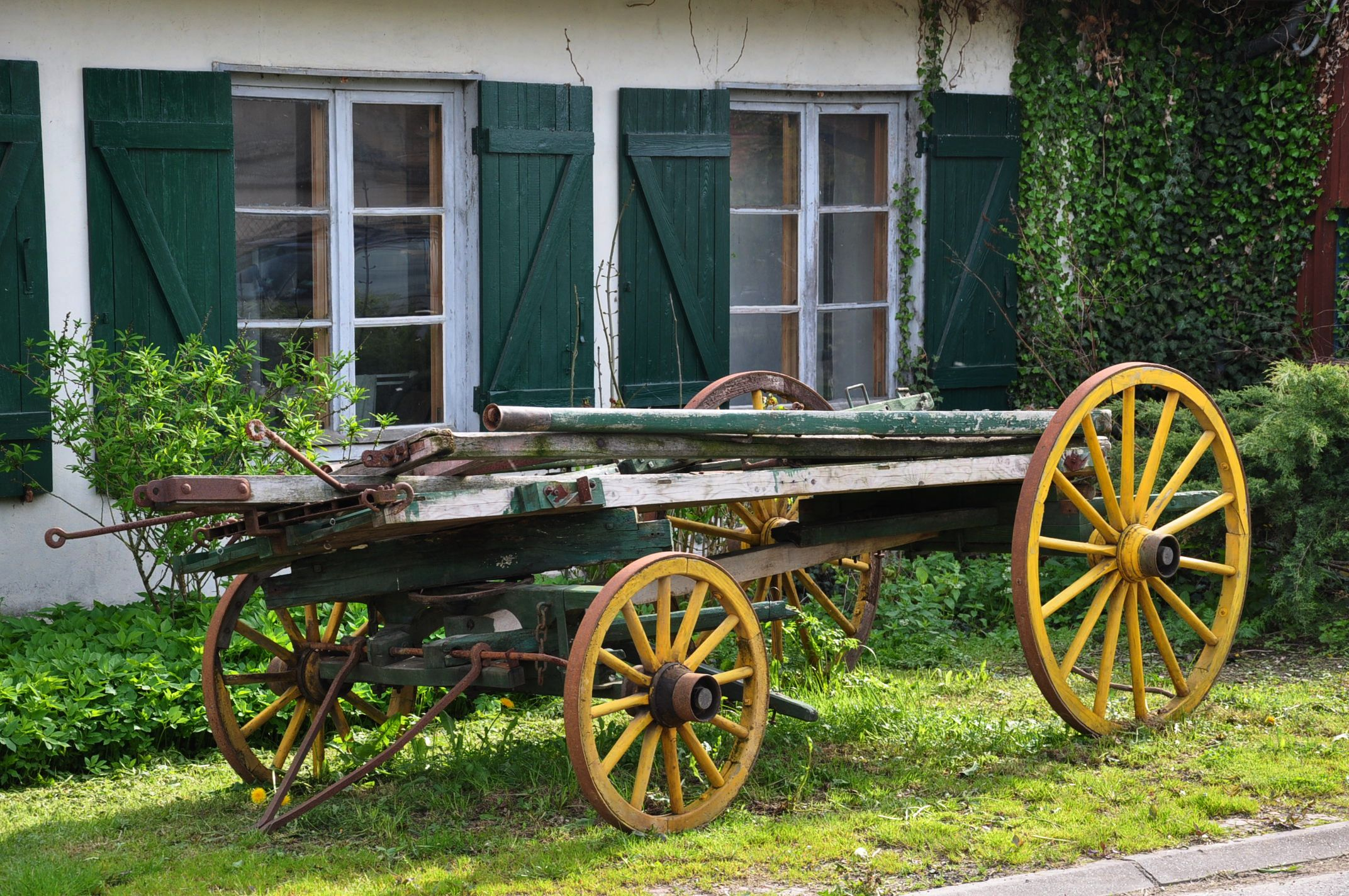
Old cart in the village

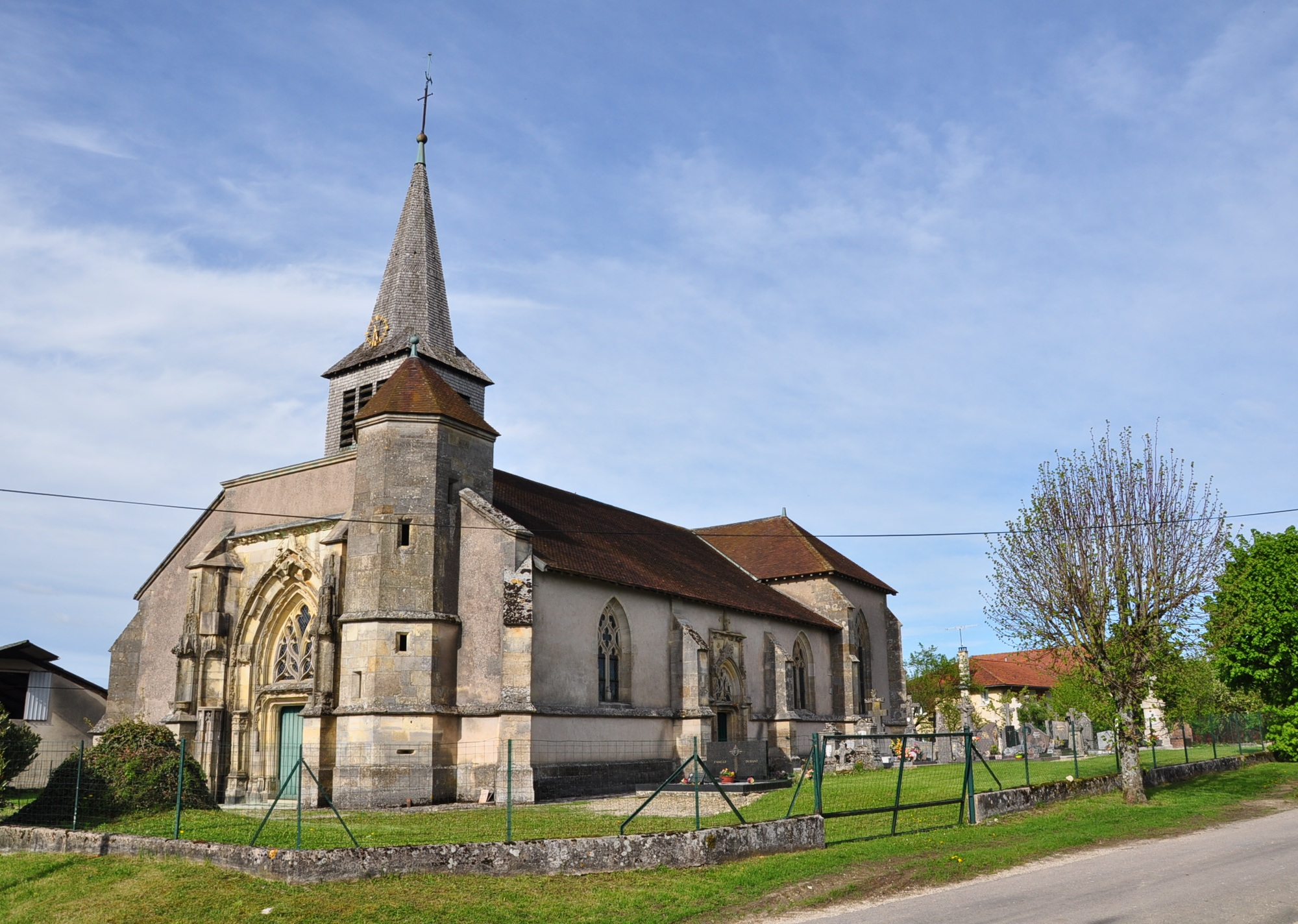
Parish Church of St. John the Baptist

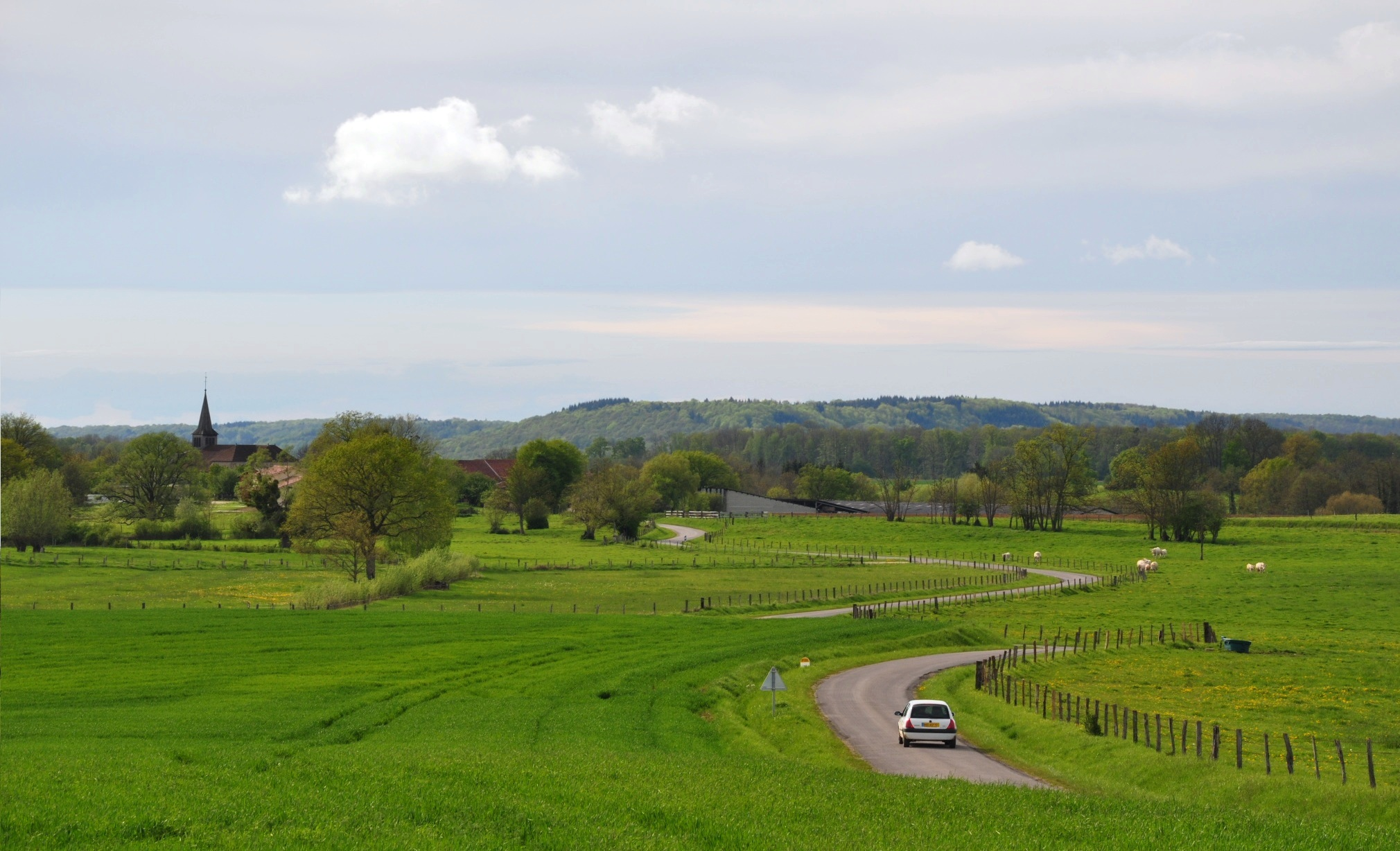
Approaching Foucaucourt
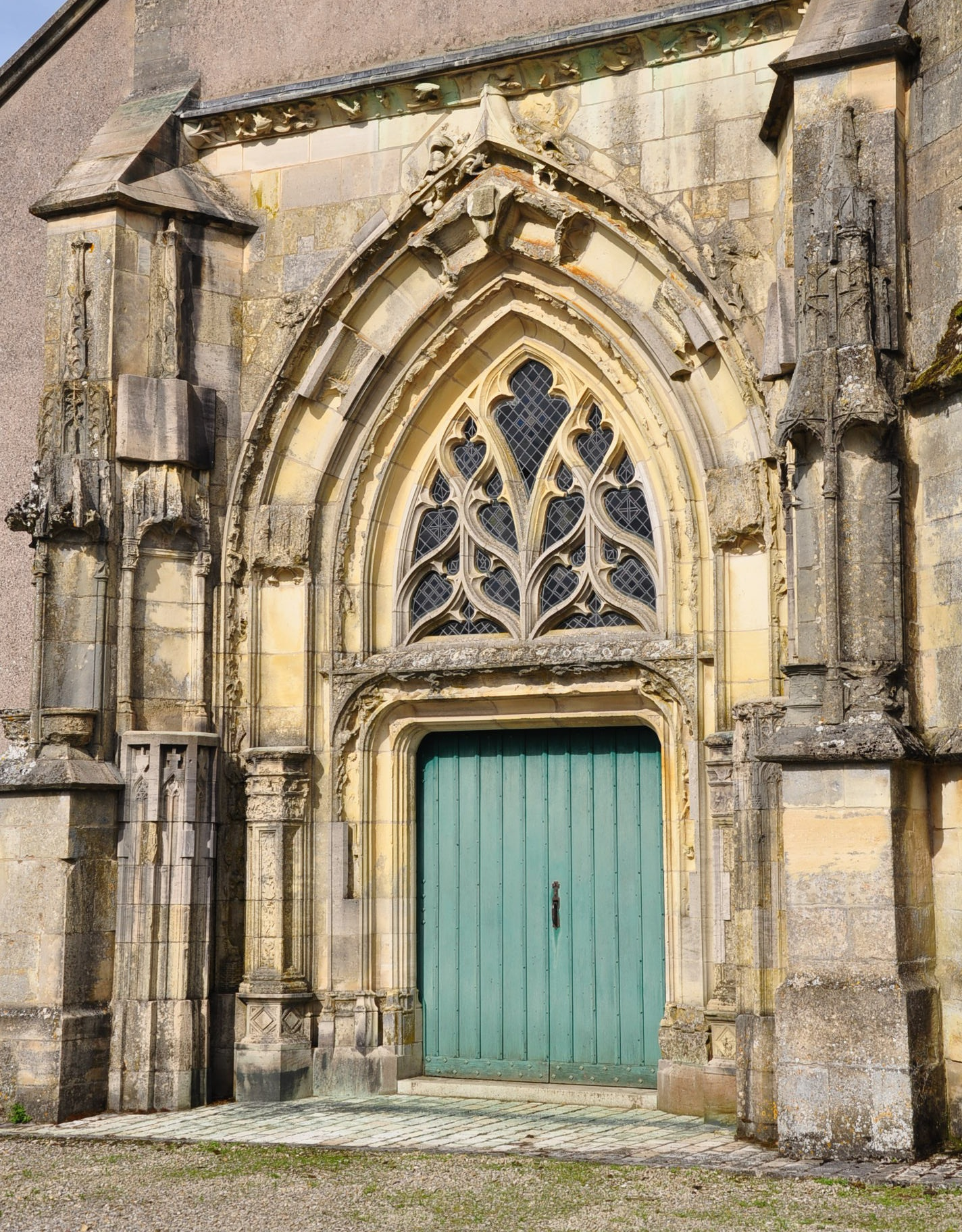
Church entrance

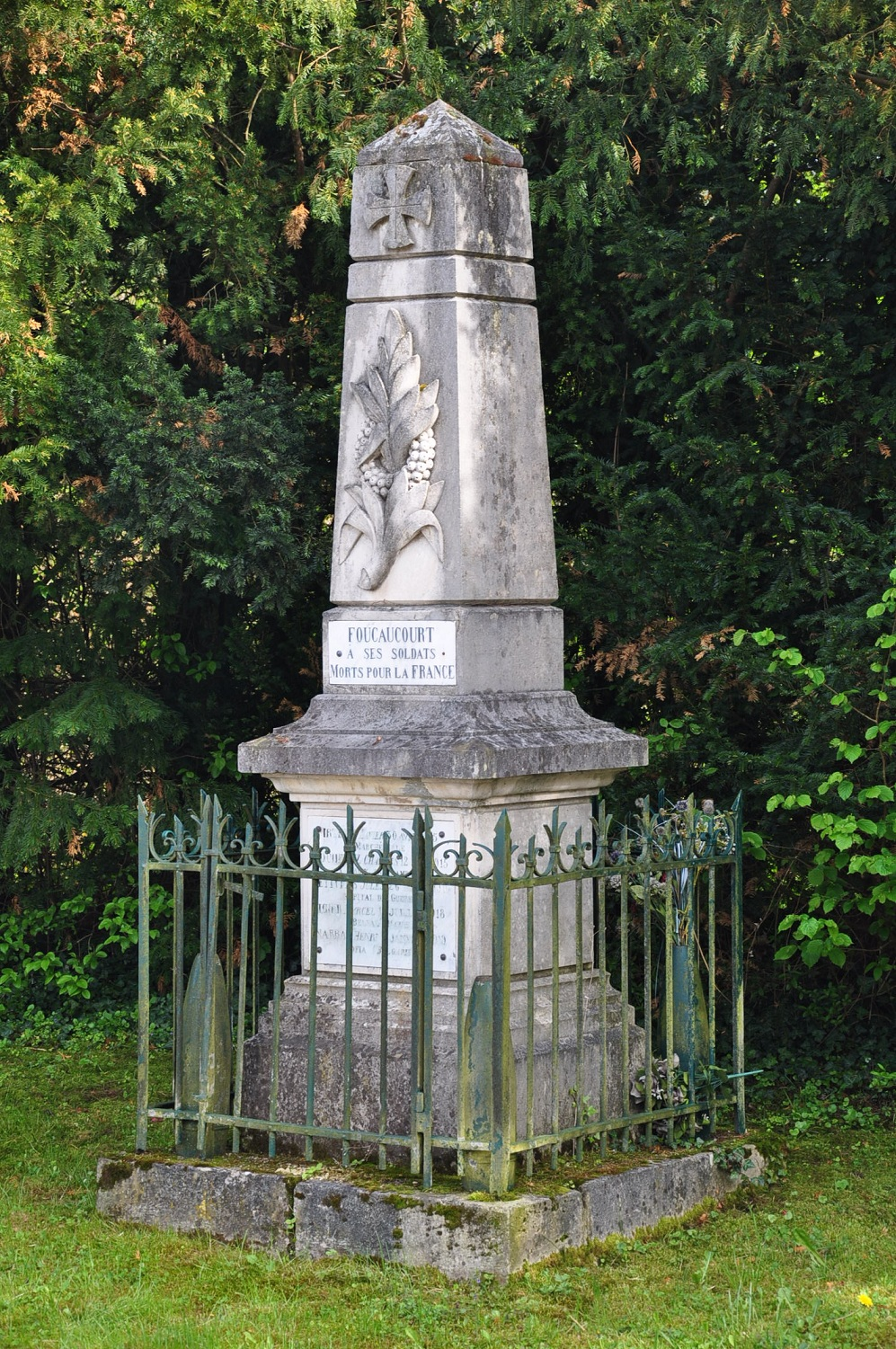
WW-I memorial
