= Beausite =

- Commune
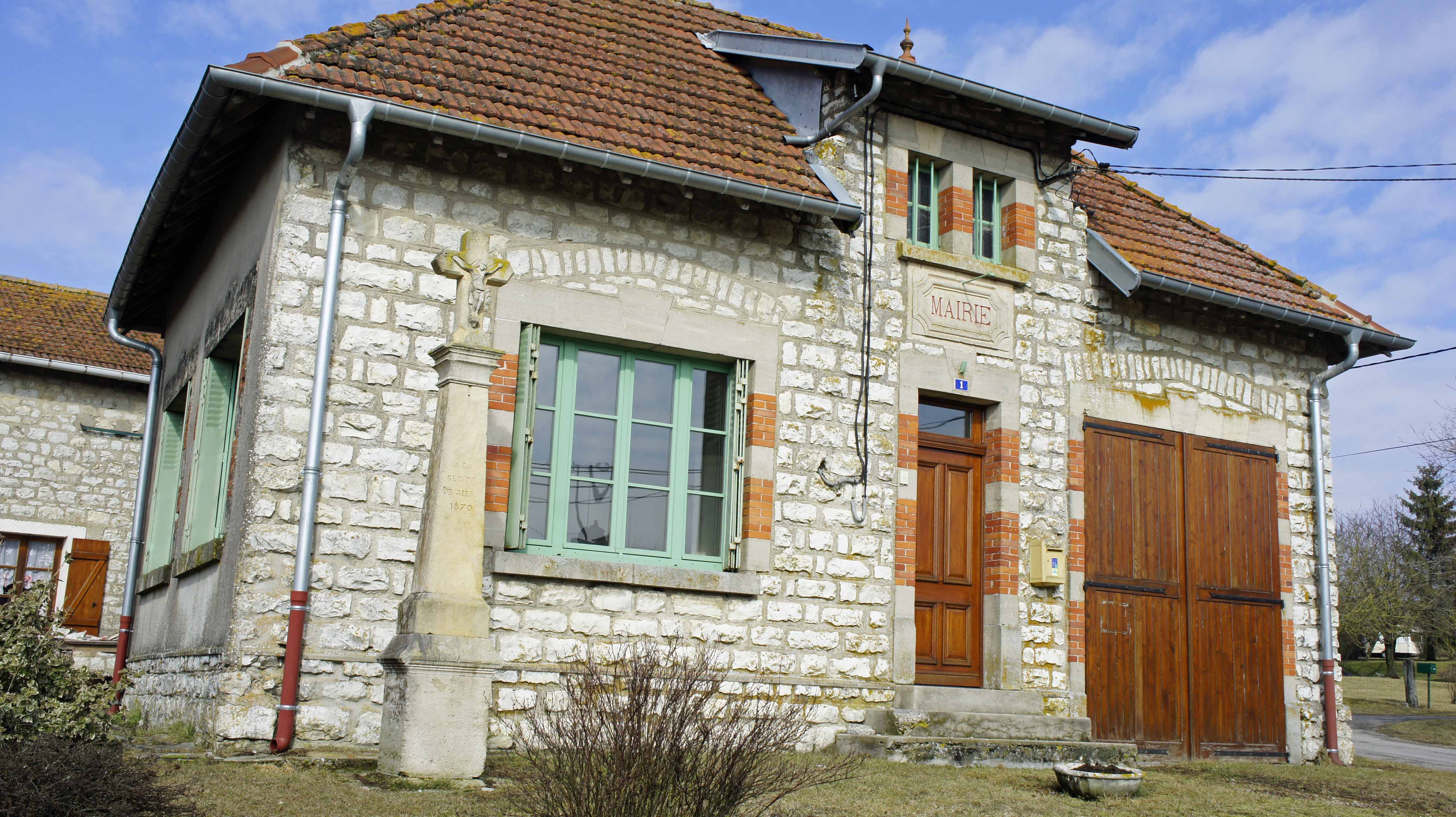
- The Amblaincourt town hall in Beausite

- Coat of arms
- Location of Beausite
- Location within France Location within Grand Est
- Coordinates: 48°58′07″N 5°11′34″E
- Country: France
- Region: Grand Est
- Department: Meuse
- Arrondissement: Bar-le-Duc
- Canton: Dieue-sur-Meuse
- Intercommunality: CC de l'Aire à l'Argonne

Government
  - Mayor (2020–2026): Didier Zambaux
- Area^{1}: 25.41 km^{2} (9.81 sq mi)
- Elevation: 235 m (771 ft)
- Highest elevation: 336 m (1,102 ft)
- Lowest elevation: 219 m (719 ft)
- Population (2023): 257
  - Density: 10.1/km^{2} (26.2/sq mi)
- Time zone: UTC+01:00 (CET)
  - Summer (DST): UTC+02:00 (CEST)
- INSEE/Postal code: 55040 /55250
- ^{1} French Land Register data, which excludes lakes, ponds, glaciers > 1 km^{2} (0.386 sq mi or 247 acres) and river estuaries.

Beausite (French pronunciation: [bozˈit]) is a commune in the Meuse department in the Grand Est region in northeastern France.

The commune was established by the merger of the former communes Beauzée-sur-Aire, Amblaincourt, Deuxnouds-devant-Beauzée, and Seraucourt on 1 January 1973.

== Population ==
Historical population
| Year | Pop. | ±% p.a. |
|---|---|---|
| 1968 | 420 | — |
| 1975 | 370 | −1.79% |
| 1982 | 338 | −1.28% |
| 1990 | 337 | −0.04% |
| 1999 | 278 | −2.12% |
| 2007 | 287 | +0.40% |
| 2012 | 257 | −2.18% |
| 2017 | 250 | −0.55% |
| 2023 | 257 | +0.46% |
Source: INSEE

== See also ==
- Communes of the Meuse department
