= Seripando =

Seripando is an Italian surname. Notable people with the surname include:

- Antonio Seripando (1476–1531), Italian humanist
- Girolamo Seripando (1493–1563), Augustinian friar
