= Brizeaux =

- Commune
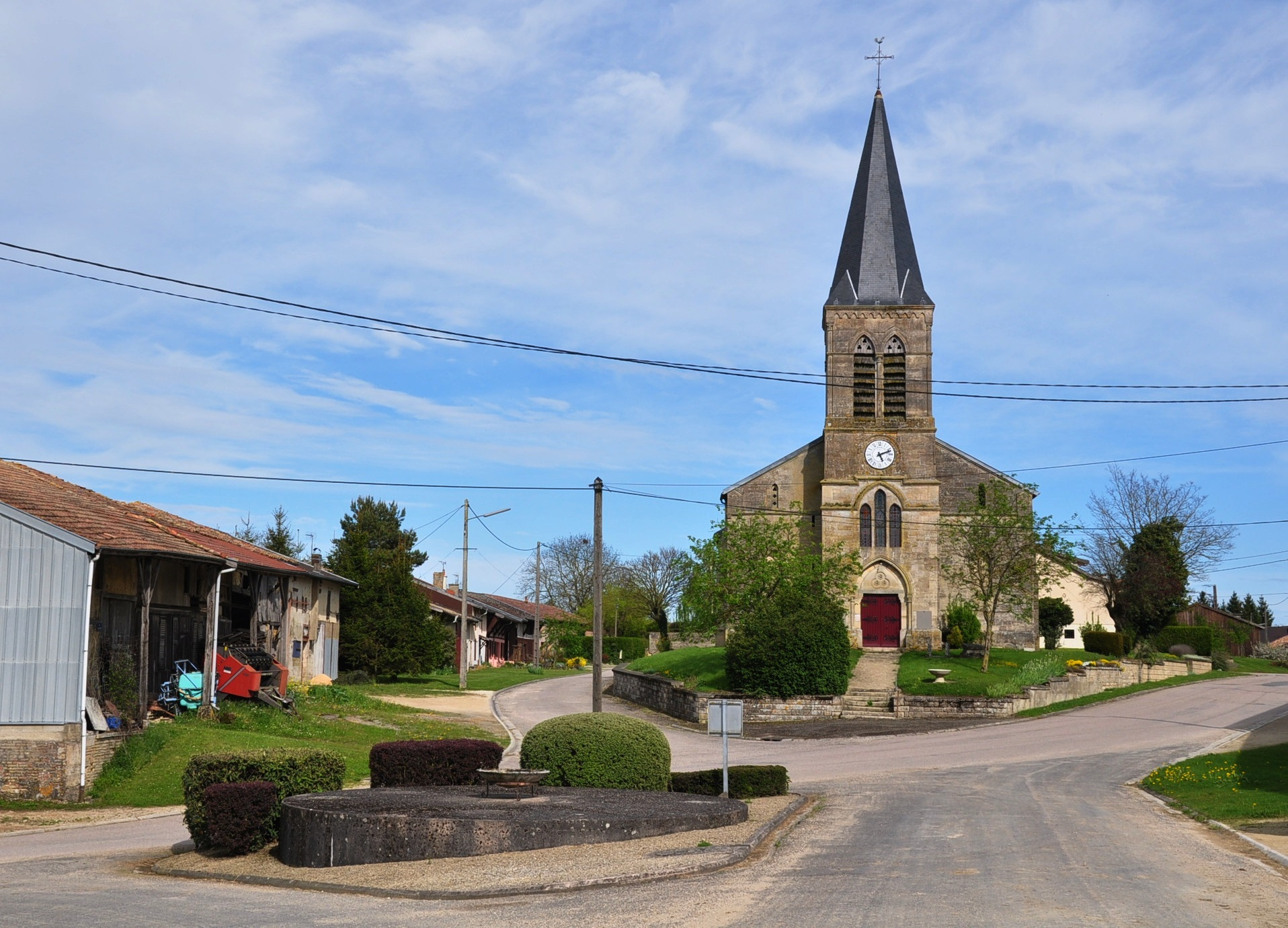
- The church and surroundings in Brizeaux

- Coat of arms
- Location of Brizeaux
- Location within France Location within Grand Est
- Coordinates: 49°00′24″N 5°03′28″E
- Country: France
- Region: Grand Est
- Department: Meuse
- Arrondissement: Bar-le-Duc
- Canton: Dieue-sur-Meuse
- Intercommunality: CC de l'Aire à l'Argonne

Government
  - Mayor (2020–2026): Céline Philippot
- Area^{1}: 8.33 km^{2} (3.22 sq mi)
- Elevation: 185 m (607 ft)
- Highest elevation: 250 m (820 ft)
- Lowest elevation: 159 m (522 ft)
- Population (2023): 63
  - Density: 7.6/km^{2} (20/sq mi)
- Time zone: UTC+01:00 (CET)
  - Summer (DST): UTC+02:00 (CEST)
- INSEE/Postal code: 55081 /55250
- ^{1} French Land Register data, which excludes lakes, ponds, glaciers > 1 km^{2} (0.386 sq mi or 247 acres) and river estuaries.

Brizeaux (French pronunciation: [bʁizo]) is a commune in the Argonne region and Meuse department in the Grand Est region in northeastern France.

Brizeaux is the only village in the commune. The nearest town is Sainte-Menehould, 20 km to the northwest. Paris is 214 km away.

== Population ==
Historical population
Year	Pop.	±% p.a.
1968	94	—
1975	70	−4.12%
1982	62	−1.72%
1990	48	−3.15%
1999	53	+1.11%
2007	47	−1.49%
2012	52	+2.04%
2017	58	+2.21%
2023	63	+1.39%
Source: INSEE

== See also ==
- Communes of the Meuse department
