= Seuil-d'Argonne =

- Commune
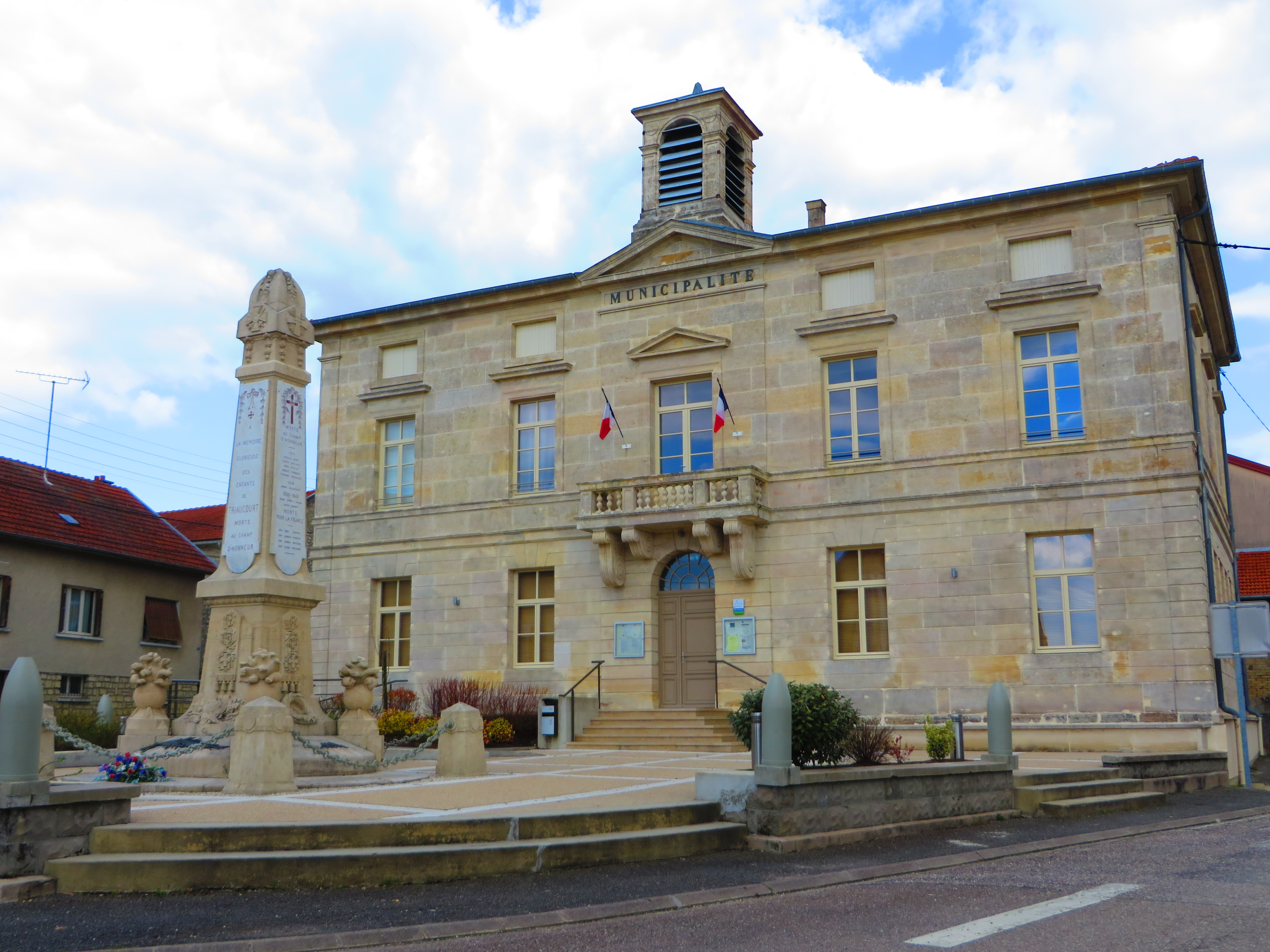
- The town hall in Seuil-d'Argonne

- Coat of arms
- Location of Seuil-d'Argonne
- Location within France Location within Grand Est
- Coordinates: 48°58′46″N 5°03′46″E
- Country: France
- Region: Grand Est
- Department: Meuse
- Arrondissement: Bar-le-Duc
- Canton: Dieue-sur-Meuse
- Intercommunality: CC de l'Aire à l'Argonne

Government
  - Mayor (2020–2026): Vincent Lombart
- Area^{1}: 25.44 km^{2} (9.82 sq mi)
- Elevation: 232 m (761 ft)
- Highest elevation: 218 m (715 ft)
- Lowest elevation: 154 m (505 ft)
- Population (2023): 530
  - Density: 21/km^{2} (54/sq mi)
- Time zone: UTC+01:00 (CET)
  - Summer (DST): UTC+02:00 (CEST)
- INSEE/Postal code: 55517 /55250
- ^{1} French Land Register data, which excludes lakes, ponds, glaciers > 1 km^{2} (0.386 sq mi or 247 acres) and river estuaries.

Seuil-d'Argonne is a commune in the Meuse department in Grand Est in north-eastern France. It was established in 1973 by the merger of the former communes Triaucourt-en-Argonne, Pretz and Senard. Pretz became an independent commune again in 1990.

== Geography ==
The main village of Seuil-d'Argonne is Triaucourt-en-Argonne. It is the seat of the municipality. To the west is Senard, the second centre of the municipality in the Aisne valley. Aubercy is a hamlet situated in the north-west of the commune. The commune is also crossed by the Marque.

== Climate ==
On average, Seuil-d'Argonne experiences 57.9 days per year with a minimum temperature below 0 °C (32.0 °F), 1.5 days per year with a minimum temperature below −10 °C (14.0 °F), 6.3 days per year with a maximum temperature below 0 °C (32.0 °F), and 13.7 days per year with a maximum temperature above 30 °C (86.0 °F). The record high temperature was 40.1 °C (104.2 °F) on July 25, 2019, while the record low temperature was −17.8 °C (0.0 °F) on December 20, 2009.

Climate data for Triaucourt (1991–2020 normals, extremes 2008–present)
| Month | Jan | Feb | Mar | Apr | May | Jun | Jul | Aug | Sep | Oct | Nov | Dec | Year |
|---|---|---|---|---|---|---|---|---|---|---|---|---|---|
| Record high °C (°F) | 16.3 (61.3) | 20.4 (68.7) | 25.4 (77.7) | 28.1 (82.6) | 32.8 (91.0) | 36.5 (97.7) | 40.1 (104.2) | 37.6 (99.7) | 34.6 (94.3) | 28.4 (83.1) | 22.8 (73.0) | 17.3 (63.1) | 40.1 (104.2) |
| Mean daily maximum °C (°F) | 5.7 (42.3) | 7.1 (44.8) | 11.7 (53.1) | 16.4 (61.5) | 19.7 (67.5) | 23.2 (73.8) | 25.7 (78.3) | 25.2 (77.4) | 21.2 (70.2) | 15.9 (60.6) | 10.4 (50.7) | 6.9 (44.4) | 15.8 (60.4) |
| Daily mean °C (°F) | 3.1 (37.6) | 3.8 (38.8) | 6.9 (44.4) | 10.4 (50.7) | 13.7 (56.7) | 17.3 (63.1) | 19.4 (66.9) | 19.1 (66.4) | 15.4 (59.7) | 11.6 (52.9) | 7.4 (45.3) | 4.2 (39.6) | 11.0 (51.8) |
| Mean daily minimum °C (°F) | 0.4 (32.7) | 0.4 (32.7) | 2.1 (35.8) | 4.4 (39.9) | 7.8 (46.0) | 11.3 (52.3) | 13.2 (55.8) | 13.0 (55.4) | 9.5 (49.1) | 7.3 (45.1) | 4.3 (39.7) | 1.5 (34.7) | 6.3 (43.3) |
| Record low °C (°F) | −12.6 (9.3) | −13.4 (7.9) | −8.7 (16.3) | −6.3 (20.7) | −1.5 (29.3) | 1.4 (34.5) | 4.0 (39.2) | 3.1 (37.6) | −0.1 (31.8) | −6.1 (21.0) | −8.1 (17.4) | −17.8 (0.0) | −17.8 (0.0) |
| Average precipitation mm (inches) | 73.2 (2.88) | 63.0 (2.48) | 53.5 (2.11) | 44.4 (1.75) | 76.9 (3.03) | 67.0 (2.64) | 56.0 (2.20) | 65.5 (2.58) | 62.2 (2.45) | 72.8 (2.87) | 72.0 (2.83) | 90.2 (3.55) | 796.7 (31.37) |
| Average precipitation days (≥ 1.0 mm) | 12.8 | 11.3 | 9.3 | 7.6 | 12.1 | 9.9 | 8.1 | 7.9 | 7.5 | 10.7 | 12.6 | 14.4 | 124.2 |
Source: Meteociel

== Personality ==
- Claude Aubery (c.1545-1596), physician, philosopher and theologian.

== See also ==
- Communes of the Meuse department
